= Margaret =

Female given name

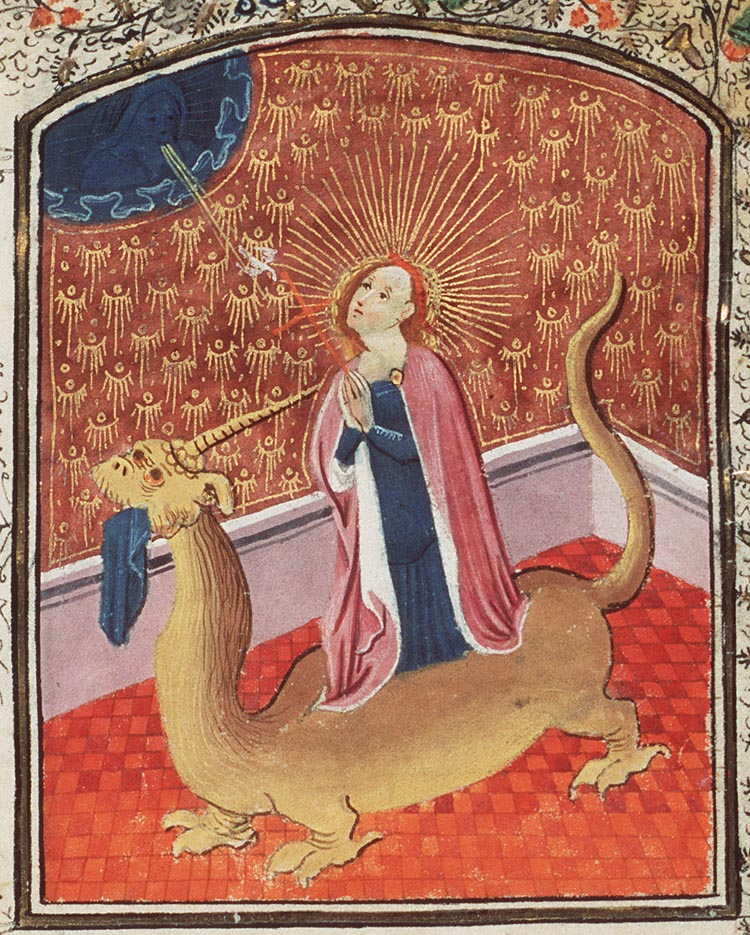
- Margaret the Virgin is one of many saints named Margaret
- Pronunciation: English: /ˈmɑːrɡərət/
- Gender: Female
- Name day: 23 May or 25 January

Origin
- Languages: Latin, Greek and Iranian
- Meaning: Pearl

Other names
- Related names: Daisy, Gretchen, Gretel, Grethe, Greta, Maggie, Máiréad, Madge, Marguerite, Margarita, Margareta, Margaretta, Margarida, Margarete, Margarethe, Marge, Margherita, Margo, Margot, Margie, Margit, Margrit, Megan, Mette, Maisie, Małgorzata, Rita, Peggy

Margaret is a feminine given name, which means "pearl". It is of Latin origin, via Ancient Greek and ultimately from Old Iranian. It has been an English name since the 11th century, and remained popular throughout the Middle Ages. It became less popular between the 16th and 18th century, but became more common again after this period, becoming the second-most popular female name in the United States in 1903. Since this time, it has become less common, but was still the ninth-most common name for women of all ages in the United States as of the 1990 census.

Margaret has many diminutive forms in many languages, including Daisy, Greta, Gretchen, Maggie, Madge, Maisie, Marge, Margie, Margo, Margot, Marnie, Meg, Megan, Molly, Peggy, and Rita.

== Etymology ==
Margaret is derived via French (Marguerite) and Latin (Margarita) from Ancient Greek: μαργαρίτης/μαργαριτάρι (margarítēs/margaritari) meaning "pearl" and μαργαρίτα (margarita) which means "daisy", via Persian مروارید murwārīd, meaning "pearl". Margarita (given name) traces the etymology further as مروارید, morvārīd in modern Persian, derived from Sogdian marγārt, both meaning 'pearl'. It ultimately traces its roots to Old Iranian -mr‌gāhrīta*, "derived from a shell".

== Name variants ==
=== Full name ===
- Mairead (Scottish)
- Maighread (Scottish)
- Máiréad/Mairéad (Irish)
- Máighréad/Maighréad (Irish)
- Máirghréad/Mairghréad (Irish)
- Margaretha (Dutch), (German), (Indonesian), (Swedish)
- Małgorzata (Polish)
- Markéta (Czech)
- Margaryta (Ukrainian)
- Margriet (Dutch)
- Margit (Hungarian)
- Margrit (German)
- Margrith (German)
- Marjorie (English)
- Morvarid مروارید (Persian)
- Margalit מרגלית (Hebrew)
- Μαργαρίτα (Greek)

=== Diminutives ===
- Mae (English)
- Maggie (English)
- Maisie (Scottish)
- Meta (German)

=== First half ===
- Margot (French)
- Megan (Welsh)
- Margol (Hebrew)

=== Second half ===
- Greta (English), (German), (Italian), (Lithuanian), (Polish), (Swedish),
- Gretchen (English), (German),
- Rita (English), (Estonian), (Hungarian), (Italian), (Indonesian)
- Reet (Estonian)
- Greet (Dutch)
- Griet (Dutch)

=== Double ===
- Margaret Jane

== Nobility ==
=== Austria ===
- Margaret, Countess of Tyrol (1318–1369)

=== Belgium and the Netherlands ===
- Margaret, Marchioness of Namur (1194–1270)
- Margaret of Austria, Duchess of Savoy (1480–1530), Princess of Asturias and Duchess of Savoy by her two marriages
- Margaret of Parma (1522–1586), illegitimate daughter of Charles V and Johanna Maria van der Gheynst, Governor of the Habsburg Netherlands
- Margaret of York (1446–1503), Duchess of Burgundy and wife of Charles the Bold, Regent of France
- Margaret de La Marck-Arenberg (1527–1599), ruling countess of Arenberg

=== Denmark ===
- Margaret I of Denmark (1353–1412), founder of the Kalmar Union
- Margrethe II of Denmark (born 1940)
- Margaret Vinstarr, Danish courtier in Scotland to Anne of Denmark

=== England, Scotland, Wales, and Great Britain ===
- Margaret Alexander, Countess Alexander of Tunis (1905–1977), British aristocrat and activist
- Margaret Audley, 2nd Baroness Audley (c. 1318–1349), English noblewoman
- Margaret Audley, Duchess of Norfolk (died 1564), English noblewoman
- Margaret Beauchamp, Countess of Shrewsbury (c. 1404–1467), English noblewoman
- Margaret Beaufort, multiple people
- Margaret Bentinck, Duchess of Portland (1715–1785), British duchess
- Margaret de Bohun, Countess of Devon (1311–1391), English noblewoman and bibliophile
- Margaret Bourchier, Countess of Bath (c. 1509–1561), English noblewoman
- Margaret de Braose, Lady of Trim, Anglo-Welsh noblewoman
- Margaret Brisbane, 5th Lady Napier, Scottish peer
- Margaret Brooke (1849–1936), white Ratuh Consort of Sarawak
- Margaret Bryan, English noble
- Margaret Butler, Countess of Ormond (died 1542), Irish countess
- Margaret Cambridge, Marchioness of Cambridge (1873–1929), British peeress
- Margaret Campbell, Duchess of Argyll (1912–1993), socialite
- Margaret Child Villiers, Countess of Jersey (1849–1945), English political hostess and philanthropist
- Margaret de Clare (1293–1342), English noblewoman
- Margaret de Clare, Baroness Badlesmere (1287–1333/4), Anglo-Norman noblewoman and the wife of Bartholomew de Badlesmere, 1st Baron Badlesmere
- Margaret Clifford, Countess of Cumberland (1560–1616), English noblewoman
- Margaret Clive (1735–1817), British society figure
- Margaret Coke, Countess of Leicester (1700–1775), British peer
- Margaret, Countess of Mar (died c. 1391), Scottish peeress who became Countess of Mar in her own right
- Margaret de Crussol d'Uzès (1932–1977), English oil heiress
- Margaret of Anjou (1430–1482), wife of King Henry VI of England
- Margaret Douglas (1515–1578), daughter of Margaret Tudor
- Margaret Douglas, Countess of Arran, Scottish aristocrat
- Margaret Douglas, Countess of Bothwell (died 1640), Scottish aristocrat and courtier
- Margaret Douglas, Fair Maid of Galloway (c. 1427-c. 1474), Scottish noble
- Margaret Drummond, Scottish noblewoman and mistress of King James IV of Scotland
- Margaret Drummond, Queen of Scotland (c. 1340–1375), second queen of David II of Scotland
- Margaret Mercer Elphinstone (1788–1867), Scottish society hostess
- Margaret Erskine (1515–1572), mistress of Scottish king
- Margaret Feilding, Duchess of Hamilton, 17th century Scottish noblewoman
- Margaret Fiennes, 11th Baroness Dacre (1541–1612), English noblewoman
- Lady Margaret Fortescue (1923–2013), one of the UK's largest private landowners
- Margaret Fownes-Luttrell (1726–1766), British heiress
- Margaret Godolphin (1652–1678), British courtier
- Margaret Goschen, Viscountess Goschen (1858–1943), British aristocrat
- Margaret Graham, Countess of Menteith, Scottish noblewoman
- Margaret Grey, Cambro-Norman noblewoman
- Margaret Hamilton, Lady Belhaven and Stenton, English Royalist conspirator
- Margaret Hanmer (c. 1370 – c. 1420), the wife of Owain Glyndŵr
- Lady Margaret Hay (1918–1975), British courtier
- Margaret Holland, Duchess of Clarence (c. 1385–1439), English noblewoman
- Margaret Holles, Duchess of Newcastle-upon-Tyne (1661–1715), English noblewoman
- Margaret Home, Countess of Moray (died 1683), Scottish aristocrat and compiler of recipe books
- Margaret Howard, 2nd Baroness Strathcona and Mount Royal (1854–1926), British peer and medical doctor
- Margaret Howard, Countess of Nottingham (c. 1591–1639), British noble
- Margaret Howard, Countess of Suffolk (1879–1968), American heiress
- Margaret Innes-Ker, Duchess of Roxburghe (1918–1983), British duchess
- Margaret Jones, Countess of Ranelagh (1672/1673–1728), English courtier
- Margaret Kennedy, Countess of Cassilis (died 1580), Scottish aristocrat
- Margaret Kennix (died 1585), Dutch woman who practiced medicine in London
- Margaret Lee (lady-in-waiting), English courtier and lady-in-waiting
- Margaret Leslie, 8th Countess of Rothes (died 1700), Scottish noble
- Margaret Longespée, 4th Countess of Salisbury, English noblewoman
- Margaret de Monthermer, 3rd Baroness Monthermer (1329–1394/1395), English heiress
- Margaret Nairne, 2nd Lady Nairne (1669–1747), Scottish noblewoman
- Margaret O'Carroll, 15th century Irish noblewoman
- Margaret Ogilvy, Lady Ogilvy, 18th-century Scottish Jacobite
- Lady Margaret Percy, 15th century English noblewoman
- Margaret Peverell, Countess of Derby, English noblewoman
- Margaret Pole, born Princess Margaret of York and Clarence (1473–1541), Countess of Salisbury
- Margaret de Quincy, Countess of Lincoln (c. 1206–1266), English noblewoman
- Margaret Radclyffe Livingstone Eyre (1800–1889), Scottish aristocrat
- Margaret Rhodes (1925–2016), British aristocrat and a first cousin of Queen Elizabeth II and Princess Margaret, Countess of Snowdon
- Margaret Rolle, 15th Baroness Clinton (1709–1781), British heiress
- Margaret Russell, Baroness Ampthill (1874–1957), British noblewoman
- Margaret Spencer (1472–1536), British noble
- Margaret Stanley, Countess of Derby (1540–1596), English noblewoman
- Margaret Haig Thomas, 2nd Viscountess Rhondda (1883 –1958), Welsh peeress and suffragette
- Margaret Tudor (1489–1541), elder sister of Henry VIII of England, Queen of Scots by marriage to James IV of Scotland and regent for their son, James V of Scotland
- Margaret de Vere (died 1398), English noblewoman
- Margaret Wake, 3rd Baroness Wake of Liddell, English noblewoman
- Margaret Wemyss, 3rd Countess of Wemyss (1659–1705), Scottish peer
- Margaret Willoughby (c. 1401–1493), English heiress
- Margaret Wotton, Marchioness of Dorset, English noblewoman
- Princess Margaret of Connaught (1882–1920), elder daughter of Prince Arthur, Duke of Connaught
- Princess Margaret, Countess of Snowdon (1930–2002), only sibling of Queen Elizabeth II and the younger daughter of King George VI and Queen Elizabeth
- Saint Margaret of Scotland (c. 1045–1093), Queen of Scots

=== France ===
- Margaret, Countess of Blois (died 1230)
- Margaret, Countess of Brienne (born 1365)
- Margaret of France, Queen of England (1279–1318), Queen of England as the second wife of King Edward I
- Margaret, Countess of Soissons (died 1350)
- Margaret, Countess of Vertus (1406–1466)
- Margaret of France, Duchess of Brabant (1254–1271)
- Margaret of Provence (1221–1285), Queen of France
- Margaret of Valois (1553–1615), Queen of France
- Margaret of Valois, Duchess of Berry (1523–1574), Duchess of Savoy by marriage to Duke Emmanuel Philibert of Savoy
- Margaret, Countess of Vertus (1406–1466), ruling Countess of Vertus and Etampes
- Margaret of York (1446–1503), Duchess of Burgundy and wife of Charles the Bold, Regent of France
- Margaret de Fiennes, Baroness Mortimer of Wigmore, French noblewoman
- Marguerite de Navarre (1492–1549)

=== Greece ===
- Margaret, Lady of Lisarea (fl. 1276)

=== Hungary ===
- Margaret of Hungary (1175–1223), wife of Isaac II Angelos Byzantine Emperor
- Saint Margit (1242-1270), daughter of King Béla IV of Hungary
- Margit of Luxembourg (1335-1349´), Queen of Hungary
- Margaret of Durazzo (1347-1412), Queen of Naples and Hungary and Princess of Achaea

=== Italy ===
- Margaret, Countess of Tyrol (1318–1369), present-day Italy

=== Norway ===
- Margaret of Sweden, Queen of Norway (c. 1155–1209)
- Margaret of Scotland (Maid of Norway) (1282–1290)

=== Portugal ===
- Margaret of Savoy, Vicereine of Portugal (1589–1655), the last Habsburg Vicereine of Portugal

=== Romania ===
- Margareta of Romania (born 1949)

== Religion ==
- Margaret (the Lame) of Magdeburg (c. 1210–1250), an anchoress of the St Albans Church in Magdeburg, present-day Germany
- Margaret Arthur, 17th-century Irish abbess
- Margaret Aylward (1810–1889), Irish Roman Catholic nun
- Margaret Bane (1542–1597), Scottish midwife
- Margaret E. Barber, British missionary in China
- Margaret Beaton, Scottish courtier
- Margaret Bethune (1820–1887), Scottish midwife
- Margaret Bevan (c. 1894–1953), Welsh-born child evangelist and singer
- Margaret Brennan (1831–1887), Canadian nun
- Margaret E. Burton, American missionary
- Margaret Catchpole (1762–1819), English servant girl, chronicler and deportee to Australia
- Margaret Chalmers (1763–1843), lifelong friend of Robert Burns
- Margaret Clement (1539–1612), English prioress
- Margaret Anna Cusack (1829–1899), Irish nun and religious sister
- Margaret B. Denning (1856–1935), American missionary and temperance worker
- Margaret Dixson (1877–1940), early Australian follower of the Bahá'í Faith in Melbourne, Victoria
- Margaret Durrell (1919–2007), British memoirist
- Margaret Farley (born 1935), American Sister of Mercy and theologian
- Margaret Farren (died 1804), British actress
- Margaret Fell (1614–1702), founder of the Religious Society of Friends
- Margaret Fernseed (c. 1560–1608), English prostitute, brothel-keeper, and murderer
- Margaret Fleming, Countess of Atholl, Scottish courtier and landowner
- Margaret Fletcher (1862–1943), British founder Catholic Women's League
- Margaret Forrest (1844–1929), wife of John Forrest
- Margaret Kemble Gage, wife of General Thomas Gage
- Margaret Hallahan (1802–1868), English Catholic religious sister
- Margaret Hartsyde, Scottish servant and landowner, accused of a jewel theft
- Margaret Mary Healy Murphy (1833–1907), Irish-American nun, activist and educator
- Margaret Henley, friend of J. M. Barrie
- Margaret Herschel (1810–1884), British botanical artist and hostess
- Margaret Yandes Holliday (c. 1844–1920), American Presbyterian missionary
- Margaret Idahosa (born 1943), Nigerian preacher and the first African female archbishop
- Margaret Jeans, British schoolteacher and businesswoman in Oman
- Margaret Stephen Kennedy (1814–1891), Scottish missionary
- Margaret Knox (1547–c. 1613), Scottish noblewoman and wife of John Knox
- Margaret Lambrun, Scottish woman who tried to assassinate Queen Elizabeth I
- Margaret Livingstone, Countess of Orkney, Scottish courtier and landowner
- Margaret MacDonald (1815–1840), Scottish visionary
- Margaret Macgregor (1838–1901), Scottish Catholic missionary
- Margaret MacRory (1862–1931), Australian religious sister
- Margaret Magennis, Viscountess Iveagh (c. 1673–1744), Irish viscountess
- Margaret Maher (1841–1924), Irish-American long-term domestic worker in the household of Emily Dickinson
- Margaret Mannah-Macarthy, Sierra Leonean midwife
- Margaret McEntee (born 1935), American Catholic nun and educator
- Margaret Isabelle McHenry (1860–1932), American-Canadian heiress
- Margaret McKellar (1861–1941), Canadian medical missionary
- Margaret McKenna, American religious sister and anti-war activist
- Margaret Mostyn (1625–1679), English Carmelite
- Margaret Myles (1892–1988), Scottish midwife
- Margaret Paleologa (1510–1566), marquise of Montserrat
- Margaret Purves (1934–2021), British George Cross recipient
- Margaret Radclyffe, English Elizabethan courtier
- Margaret Reid (1923–2018), New Zealand religious sister
- Margaret Sampson (1906–1988), English nun
- Margaret Peoples Shirer (1897–1983), American Pentecostal Christian missionaries to West Africa
- Margaret Sinclair (1900–1925), Scottish Roman Catholic nun
- Margaret Charles Smith (1906–2004), African-American midwife
- Margaret Stewart, Lady Gordon, illegitimate daughter of James IV in Scotland
- Margaret Stewart, Mistress of Ochiltree (died 1627), courtier in the household of Anne of Denmark in Scotland
- Margaret Beveridge Stevenson (1865–1941), first New Zealand member of the Baháʼí Faith
- Margaret Stott Bhore (1884–1945), British missionary
- Margaret Young Taylor (1837–1919), American Church of Latter-Day Saints member and presidential plural wife
- Margaret Tebbit (1934–2020), English nurse and wife of Norman Tebbit
- Margaret Throckmorton (1591–1668), English prioress
- Margaret Towner (born 1925), American religious leader
- Margaret Traxler (1924–2002), American religious sister and feminist
- Margaret Newton Van Cott (1830–1914), first female Methodist Episcopal evangelist in America
- Margaret Louisa Vanderbilt Shepard (1845–1924), American heiress
- Margaret Vertue (born 1953), South African Anglican bishop
- Margaret Wake Tryon (c. 1732–1819), English heiress and wife of William Tryon
- Margaret Waterchief (died 2020), Blackfoot elder and Anglican priest
- Margaret Wenig, American rabbi

=== Canonised ===
- Margaret Clitherow (1556–1586)
- Margaret the Barefooted (1325–1395)
- Saint Margaret Mary Alacoque (1647–1690)
- Saint Margaret of Castello (1287–1320)
- Saint Margaret of Cortona (1247–1297)
- Saint Margaret of England (died 1192)
- Saint Margaret of Hungary (1242–1270)
- Saint Margaret of Scotland (1045–1093)
- Saint Margaret the Virgin (c. 209–304 AD), the oldest and most prominent St. Margaret; also known as Margaret of Antioch

=== Beatified ===
- Margaret Mary Alacoque (1647–1690), Catholic Saint and Mystic
- Margaret Ball (1515–1584), Lady Mayoress of Dublin and Catholic martyr
- Margaret Cheyne (died 1537), English Catholic martyr
- Margaret Clitherow (1556–1586), English saint and martyr
- Margaret Fredkulla, queen of Denmark and Norway
- Margaret Leijonhufvud (1516–1551), queen of Sweden
- Margaret Pole, Countess of Salisbury (1473–1541)
- Margaret Polley, English Protestant martyr
- Margaret Sambiria, queen of Denmark (1252–1259)
- Margaret Skulesdatter, queen of Norway
- Margaret Stewart, Dauphine of France (1424–1445)
- Margaret Stewart, Duchess of Touraine (1370–1405), Scottish peeress
- Margaret Tudor, queen of Scotland (1503–1513)
- Margaret Ward (1550–1588), English Catholic martyr
- Margaret Wilson, Scottish Presbyterian

== Arts, actresses, writers and music ==
- Maggie Smith (1934–2024), British actress
- Maisie Williams (born 1997), English actress
- Margaret Agnew Blennerhassett (c. 1771–1842), American poet
- Margaret Ahern (1921–1999), American cartoonist and illustrator
- Margaret Allen (1832–1914), Irish artist
- Margaret C. Anderson (1886–1973), American magazine editor
- Margaret Frances Andrews (1894–1945), American show dog breeder
- Margaret Anglin (1876–1958), Canadian stage actress, director and producer
- Margaret Uyauperq Aniksak (1907–1993), Inuk sculptor
- Margaret Armen (1921–2003), American screenwriter and author
- Margaret Armour (1860–1943), Scottish poet, novelist and translator
- Margaret Neilson Armstrong (1867–1944), American book cover designer, illustrator and author
- Margaret Ascham, 16th century English writer
- Margaret Ashcroft (1931–2016), British actress
- Margaret Ashmore Sudduth (1859–1957), American educator, editor, temperance advocate
- Margaret Ashmun (1875–1940), American writer
- Margaret Atwood (born 1939), Canadian novelist and poet
- Margaret Aull, New Zealand painter and curator
- Margaret Avery (born 1944), American actress
- Margaret Avison (1918–2007), Canadian poet
- Margaret Ayer (1894–1981), American author and illustrator
- Margaret Backhouse (1818–1888), British portrait and genre painter
- Margaret Jewett Bailey (c. 1812–1882), American poet
- Margaret L. Bailey (1812–c. 1888), American newspaper publisher and poet
- Margaret Baker Genovesi (c. 1933–2022), Australian soprano
- Margaret Bakkes (1931–2016), South African writer
- Margaret Balderson, Australian novelist and children's writer
- Margaret Balfour (1892–1961), English classical soprano
- Margaret Ball (born 1947), American novelist
- Margaret Bannerman (1896–1976), Canadian actress
- Margaret Culkin Banning (1891–1982), American novelist
- Margaret Barbalet, Australian novelist and historian
- Margaret Barber (1869–1901), English Christian writer
- Margaret M. Barbour Stone (1841–1913), American writer
- Margaret Barker (actress) (1908–1992), American actress, director, producer, educator, and playwright
- Margaret Barker (artist) (1907–2003), British artist
- Margaret Barker (theologian) (born 1944), British Methodist preacher and biblical scholar
- Margaret Barnard (1898–1992), British painter and linocut maker
- Margaret Ayer Barnes (1886–1967), American dramatist
- Margaret Campbell Barnes (1891–1963), English writer
- Margaret Barr (1904–1991), Australian dance-drama choreographer
- Margaret Barrington (1896–1982), Irish writer and journalist
- Margaret Barry (1917–c. 1989), Irish musical artist
- Margaret Barton (born 1926), British actress
- Margaret Baskerville (1861–1930), Australian sculptor
- Margaret Baxtresser (1922–2005), American pianist
- Margaret Beale (1886–1969), British artist
- Margaret Beames (1935–2016), New Zealand children's book author
- Margaret Bechard (born 1953), American writer
- Margaret Becker (born 1959), American singer
- Margaret Bell-Byars (born 1962), American musical artist
- Margaret Benn Walsh (1758–1836), British collector of Indian songs
- Margaret Bennett (born 1946), British musician, broadcaster and writer
- Margaret Benson (1865–1916), British author and Egyptologist
- Margaret Bent (born 1940), English musicologist
- Margaret Berger (born 1985), Norwegian singer-songwriter
- Margaret Bert (1896–1971), American actress
- Margaret Bhatty (1930–2012), Indian writer
- Margaret Bicknell (c. 1695–1723), Scottish actress
- Margaret Biggs (born 1929), British writer
- Margaret Bingham (1740–1814), English artist
- Margaret Moyes Black (1853–1935), Scottish novelist and biographer
- Margaret Blair Young, American novelist
- Margaret Blake-Alverson, American musician
- Margaret Blanche, Danish actress
- Margaret Bland (1898–1996), American playwright and poet
- Margaret Blundell (1907–1996), British artist
- Margaret Boden (1913–2001), Scottish artist
- Margaret Jones Bolsterli (born 1931), American writer
- Margaret Wander Bonanno (1950–2021), American writer
- Margaret Bonds (1913–1972), American composer and pianist
- Margaret Bonham, British writer
- Margaret Booth (1898–2002), American film editor
- Margaret Boozer, American ceramist and sculpture artist
- Margaret Bottome (1827–1906), American reformer, author and magazine editor
- Margaret Bourke-White (1904–1971), American photojournalist
- Margaret Bowman (1928–2018), American actor
- Margaret Breen (1907–1960), American actress
- Margaret Brennan (born 1980), American journalist
- Margaret Sutton Briscoe (1864–1941), American writer
- Margaret Brouwer (born 1940), American composer and composition teacher
- Margaret Brown, American film director
- Margaret Oliver Brown (1912–1990), Scottish painter and illustrator
- Margaret Bruce Wells (1909–1998), British woodcutter
- Margaret Brundage (1900–1976), American illustrator and painter
- Margaret Bryant (1870–1942), British writer
- Margaret Warriner Buck (1857–1929), American botanical and scientific artist
- Margaret Buechner (1922–1998), American composer
- Margaret Buffie (born 1945), Canadian young adult fiction writer
- Margaret Agnes Bunn (1799–c. 1883), British actress
- Margaret Burke Sheridan (1889–1958), Irish opera singer
- Margaret Burton (1924–1984), English actress
- Margaret Busby, Ghanaian British publisher and writer
- Margaret Lesley Bush-Brown (1857–1944), American painter and etcher
- Margaret Butler (1883–1947), New Zealand sculptor
- Margaret Cabourn-Smith, English comedy actress
- Margaret Calkin James (1895–1985), British artist
- Margaret Calvert (born 1936), British typographer and graphic designer
- Margaret Cameron (1867–1947), American writer and musician
- Margaret Campbell (actress) (1883–1939), American actress
- Margaret Canovan (1939–2018), English political theorist
- Margaret Carlson (born 1988), American journalist
- Margaret Carnegie (1910–2002), Australian writer, collector and patron of the arts
- Margaret Sarah Carpenter (1793–1872), English portrait painter
- Margaret Seymour Carpenter (1893–1987), American novelist
- Margaret Carr (writer) (1913–2008), Canadian columnist and food editor
- Margaret Carr (novelist) (born 1935), British novelist
- Margaret Carroux (1912–1991), German translator
- Margaret Cavendish, Duchess of Newcastle-upon-Tyne (1623–1673), English writer, poet, and playwright
- Margaret Cezair-Thompson (born 1956), Jamaican writer
- Margaret Chalmers, Scottish poet
- Margaret Chapman (1940–2000), English painter
- Margaret Cheer, American actress
- Margaret Chen (born 1951), Jamaican sculptor
- Margaret Chilton, British stained glass artist and instructor
- Margaret Cho (born 1968), American comedian and actress
- Margaret Christakos (born 1962), Canadian poet
- Margaret Christensen (1921–2009), Australian radio hostess and actress
- Margaret Christl, Canadian musical artist
- Margaret Chung (born 1976), Canadian actress
- Margaret Cilento (1923–2017), Australian artist
- Margaret Clancey (1897–1989), American film editor and actress
- Margaret Clark (born 1943), Australian author
- Margaret Goff Clark (1913–2003), American children's book author
- Margaret Clarke (1881–1961), Irish portrait painter
- Margaret Clarkson (born 1941), English artist
- Margaret Cleaves (1848–1917), American physician, writer
- Margaret Clunie (born 1987), English actress
- Margaret Cockburn Conkling (1814–1890), American writer
- Margaret Coe (born 1941), American painter
- Margaret Cogswell (born 1947), American artist
- Margaret Colin (born 1958), American actress
- Margaret Wootten Collier (1869–1947), American author
- Margaret Cookhorn, English contrabassoonist
- Margaret Cooper (1877–1922), English music hall performer
- Margaret Cossaceanu (1893–1980), French sculptor
- Margaret Costa (1917–1999), British food writer and restaurateur
- Margaret Courtenay (1923–1996), Welsh actress
- Margaret Courtney-Clarke (born 1949), Namibian photographer
- Margaret Cousins (1905–1996), American editor, journalist and writer
- Margaret Covey Chisholm (1909–1965), American painter
- Margaret Coxe, American writer and educator
- Margaret Craig (born 1966), American artist
- Margaret Craske (1892–1990), British ballet dancer, choreographer and teacher
- Margaret Craven (1901–1980), American author
- Margaret French Cresson (1889–1973), American sculptor
- Margaret Croker, English poet and novelist
- Margaret Crosland (1920–2017), English literary biographer and translator
- Margaret Cullen (c. 1767–1837), Scottish novelist
- Margaret Cunningham, Scottish memoirist and strong protestant
- Margaret Curran, Australian writer
- Margaret Dale (actress) (1876–1972), American stage and film actress
- Margaret Dale (dancer) (1922–2010), British dancer
- Margaret Danner, American poet
- Margaret Dare (1902–1976), Scottish composer and cellist
- Margaret Darrell (1891–1984), American film editor
- Margaret May Dashiell (1867–1958), American artist and writer
- Margaret Daum (1906–1977), American opera singer
- Margaret Miller Davidson (1823–1838), American poet
- Margaret Davies (c. 1700–1778/1785), Welsh poet and manuscript collector
- Margaret Thomson Davis (1926–2016), Scottish novelist
- Margaret Day Blake (1876–1971), American art collector and philanthropist
- Margaret Deland (1857–1945), American author
- Margaret Deneke, English pianist, musicologist, choirmaster and benefactor
- Margaret DePriest (born 1931), American actress
- Margaret Rebecca Dickinson (1821–1918), British botanical artist
- Margaret Isabel Dicksee (1858–1903), British painter
- Margaret Diesendorf (1912–1993), Australian poet, editor and translator
- Margaret Dillard, Native American artist and painter
- Margaret Dilloway, Japanese American author
- Margaret Dobson (1888–1981), American painter
- Margaret Stirling Dobson, Scottish printmaker
- Margaret Dodd, Australian artist and filmmaker
- Margaret Fernald Dole (1896–1970), American painter
- Margaret Doody (born 1939), Canadian author
- Margaret Dovaston (1884–1954), British painter
- Margaret Doyle (c. 1920–2002), Australian newsreader
- Margaret Drabble (born 1939), English author
- Margaret Draper (1916–2011), American actress
- Margaret Dredge (1928–2001), Australian artist
- Margaret Webb Dreyer (1911–1976), American painter
- Margaret Drynan (1915–1999), Canadian musician and writer
- Margaret Duley (1894–1968), Canadian writer
- Margaret Dumont (1882–1965), American actress
- Margaret Dunn, Irish musician
- Margaret Early (1919–2000), American actress
- Margaret Easley (born 1970), American actress and television writer
- Margaret Edson (born 1961), American playwright
- Margaret Eliot (1914–2011), English music teacher and musician
- Margaret Elphinstone (born 1948), Scottish author
- Margaret Essex, English composer
- Margaret Evangeline, American artist
- Margaret Evans Price (1888–1973), American artist and toy designer
- Margaret Evans, Canadian journalist
- Margaret Winship Eytinge (1832–1916), American writer
- Margaret Fane (1887–c. 1962), Australian poet and novelist
- Margaret Farrand Thorp (1891–1970), American journalist
- Margaret Farrar (1897–1984), journalist and crossword puzzle editor
- Margaret Feinberg, American writer
- Margaret Hart Ferraro (1913–2000), American burlesque performer
- Margaret Fiedler McGinnis, American musician
- Margaret Field (1922–2011), American actress
- Margaret Cross Primrose Findlay (1902–1968), British artist
- Margaret Fingerhut (born 1955), British classical pianist
- Margaret Fink (born 1933), Australian film producer
- Margaret Firth (1898–1991), English painter
- Margaret Fishback (1900–1985), American poet
- Margaret Fisher (born 1948), American performance and media artist
- Margaret Fisher Prout (1875–1963), British painter
- Margaret Fitchett (1875–1956), New Zealand artist
- Margaret Fitton (1902–1988), British artist
- Margaret Fitts (1923–2011), American screenwriter
- Margaret Fitzhugh Browne (1884–1972), American artist
- Margaret Flockton (1861–1953), Anglo-Australian artist and botanical illustrator
- Margaret Anne Florence (born 1978), American actress, singer and model
- Margaret Foley, 19th-century American sculptor, carver and miniature painter
- Margaret Foote Hawley (1880–1963), American painter
- Margaret Ford-Taylor, American actress
- Margaret Formby (1929–2003), American journalist
- Margaret Forster (1938–2016), British author
- Margaret Taylor Fox (1857–1942), American painter, illustrator and etcher
- Margaret Frame (1903–1985), Canadian painter
- Margaret Frankel (1902–1997), New Zealand artist
- Margaret Frazer (1946–2013), American novelist
- Margaret French (1906–1998), American artist
- Margaret Fuller (1810–1850), American critic
- Margaret Fulton (1924–2019), Australian food writer
- Margaret Gale (1930–2025), British operatic soprano
- Margaret Garcia (born 1951), Mexican-American visual artist
- Margaret Gardiner (1904–2005), British patron of artists
- Margaret Garland, British artist
- Margaret Garrett (born 1965), American artist and dancer
- Margaret Garwood (1927–2015), American composer
- Margaret C. Gates, American painter
- Margaret Geddes (writer) (born 1949), an Australian writer, journalist and historian
- Margaret Geddes (artist) (1914–1998), a British artist
- Margaret Gere (1878–1965), British artist
- Margaret Gibson (actress) (1894–1964), American actress
- Margaret Gibson (writer) (1948–2006), Canadian novelist and short story writer
- Margaret Gibson (poet) (born 1944), American poet
- Margaret Gilbert (born 1942), British philosopher
- Margaret Giles (1868–1949), British painter, sculptor and medalist
- Margaret Gillies (1803–1887), Scottish painter
- Margaret Girvin Gillin (1833–1915), Canadian-born American painter
- Margaret Gilmore (born 1956), British journalist, broadcaster, writer and analyst
- Margaret Glaspy (born 1989), American singer-songwriter
- Margaret L. Goldsmith, American novelist
- Margaret Gordon (illustrator) (1939–1989), British illustrator
- Margaret Gordon (singer) (1880–1962), Welsh singer
- Margaret Maria Gordon (1823–1907), Scottish author
- Margaret Gove Camfferman (1881–1964), American painter
- Margaret Nowell Graham (1867–1942), American artist
- Margaret Graves (1901–1962), British writer and journalist
- Margaret Green (1925–2003), British painter
- Margaret Greville (1863–1942), British socialite and philanthropist
- Margaret Ross Griffel (born 1943), American musicologist and author
- Margaret Christian Grigor (1912–1981), American sculptor and medalist
- Margaret Gurney, Australian artist
- Margaret Gwenver (1926–2010), American stage and television actress
- Margaret Bernadine Hall (1863–1910), English painter
- Margaret Halsey (1910–1997), American writer
- Margaret Halstan (1879–1967), British actress
- Margaret Hamerik (1867–1942), Danish musician
- Margaret Hamilton (publisher) (1941–2022), Australian children's literature publisher
- Margaret Hamilton (actress) (1902–1985), American film actress
- Margaret Harker (1920–2013), British photographer and historian of photography
- Margaret Harkness (1854–1923), English radical journalist and writer
- Margaret Rosezarian Harris (1943–2000), American musician, conductor, composer and educator
- Margaret Harrison (1899–1995), British violinist
- Margaret Harshaw (1909–1997), American opera singer
- Margaret Harvey, Australian actress
- Margaret Hasse, American poet and writer
- Margaret Hayes (1913–1977), American actress
- Margaret G. Hays (1874–1925), American writer
- Margaret Hazzard, Australian writer
- Margaret H'Doubler (1889–1982), American dance instructor
- Margaret Healy (born 1969), Irish singer-songwriter
- Margaret Henderson Floyd (1932–1997), American art historian
- Margaret Hendrie (1935–1990), Nauruan writer
- Margaret Herrera Chávez, American painter and printmaker
- Margaret A. Hickey (1902–1994), American journalist
- Margaret Hicks (1923–2006), American painter
- Margaret Higonnet (born 1941), American author and historian
- Margaret Hill (1929–1975), British ballerina
- Margaret Hillert (1920–2014), American writer
- Margaret Hillis (1921–1998), American conductor
- Margaret Hine, British studio potter
- Margaret Hislop (1894–1972), Scottish painter
- Margaret Hoard, American painter
- Margaret Hoberg Turrell, American composer
- Margaret Hodges (1911–2005), American writer
- Margaret Holford (1778–1852), English poet and translator
- Margaret Holford (the elder) (1757–1834), English novelist, playwright and poet
- Margaret Hollingsworth (born 1942), Canadian writer
- Margaret Brenda Holloway, New Zealand watercolour artist
- Margaret Lindsay Holton (born 1955), Canadian artist
- Margaret Hooks (1945–2021), Irish-born author and journalist
- Margaret Horder (1903–1978), Australian artist and book illustrator
- Margaret Bell Houston (c. 1877–1966), American writer and suffragist
- Margaret Hsing (1944–c. 2009), Chinese actress from Hong Kong
- Margaret Hubble (1914–2006), British radio broadcaster
- Margaret Hughes (1630–1719), British actress
- Margaret Hunt Brisbane (1858–1925), American poet
- Margaret Illington (1879–1934), American actress
- Margaret Irving (1898–1950), American actress
- Margaret Irwin (1889–1967), English historical novelist
- Margaret Ismay, British opera singer
- Margaret Jacobs, Native American artist
- Margaret Helen James, (1859–1938) English folklorist
- Margaret Thomson Janvier, American poet
- Margaret Jenkins (born 1942), American choreographer
- Margaret Jepson (1907–2003), English author
- Margaret Alison Johansen (1896–1959), American novelist
- Margaret Johansen (1923–2013), Norwegian novelist
- Margaret John (1926–2011), Welsh actress
- Margaret Johnson (artist), Australian portrait artist
- Margaret Johnson (pianist), American jazz musician
- Margaret Johnson (vocalist), American jazz musician
- Margaret Johnston (1914–2002), Australian actress
- Margaret Jones (journalist) (1923–2006), Australian journalist
- Margaret Jones (writer) (1842–1902), Welsh travel writer
- Margaret Jordan Patterson, American painter
- Margaret Joslin (1883–1956), American actress
- Margaret Jourdain (1876–1951), English writer
- Margaret Jowett, British children's writer
- Margaret Atwood Judson (1899–1991), American historian and author
- Margaret Judson, American actress
- Margaret Jull Costa (born 1949), British translator
- Margaret Junkin Preston (1820–1897), American poet
- Margaret Juntwait (1957–2015), American radio announcer
- Margaret Kahn, American writer and linguist
- Margaret Brassler Kane (1909–2006), American sculptor
- Margaret Keane (1927–2022), American painter
- Margaret Kelly (1910–2004), Irish dancer
- Margaret Kemp-Welch (1874–1968), British artist
- Margaret Stickney Kendall, American painter and sculptor
- Margaret Kennedy (1896–1967), English novelist and playwright
- Margaret Kerry (born 1929), American actress and radio host
- Margaret Keys, Irish classical soprano
- Margaret Kiddle (1914–1958), Australian writer and historian
- Margaret Kilgallen (1967–2001), American artist
- Margaret Killjoy (born 1982), American author and musician
- Margaret King, Anglo-Irish writer
- Margaret Williamson King, Scottish author
- Margaret Kitchin (1914–2008), Swiss classical pianist
- Margaret Klenck (born 1953), American actress
- Margaret Lacey (1911–1988), British actress
- Margaret Ladd (born 1945), American actress
- Margaret Landis (1891–1981), American actress
- Margaret Landon (1903–1993), American writer
- Margaret Lane (1907–1994), British journalist, biographer and novelist
- Margaret Ruthven Lang (1867–1972), American composer
- Margaret Langrick (born 1971), Canadian writer and retired actress
- Margaret Lanzetta (born 1957), American artist
- Margaret Larkin (1899–1967), American writer
- Margaret Larson (born 1958), American broadcast journalist
- Margaret Laurence (actress) (born 1950), Australian actress
- Margaret Laurence (1926–1987), Canadian novelist
- Margaret Moffett Law (1871–1956), American artist
- Margaret Lawlor-Bartlett (born 1929), New Zealand artist
- Margaret Lawrence (1889–1929), American actress
- Margaret Lazarus (born 1949), American film producer
- Margaret Leahy (1902–1967), English actress
- Margaret Lee (1943–2024), British actress
- Margaret Lee (born 1970), Singaporean actress
- Margaret Lefranc (1907–1998), American painter, illustrator and editor
- Margaret Leigh (1894–1973), English writer
- Margaret Carver Leighton (1896–1987), American children's author
- Margaret Leighton (1922–1976), English actress
- Margaret Leiteritz (1907–1976), German painter
- Margaret Lemon (born c. 1614), English artist's model
- Margaret Leng Tan, Singaporean musical artist
- Margaret Leroy, British novelist
- Margaret Lewis (1939–2019), American singer-songwriter
- Margaret Lim (1947–2011), Malaysian writer
- Margaret Lindsay (1910–1981), American actress
- Margaret H. Lippert (born 1942), American writer
- Margaret Lloyd (dance critic) (1887–1960), American dance critic
- Margaret Lloyd (soprano) (born 1973), American operatic soprano
- Margaret Lockwood (1916–1990), British actress
- Margaret Loomis (1893–1969), American film actress
- Margaret Lowengrund, American artist
- Margaret Lyons (1923–2019), Canadian public broadcasting executive
- Margaret Macadam (1902–1991), British illustrator
- Margaret MacArthur (1935–2006), American musician
- Margaret Macdonald Mackintosh (1864–1933), British artist
- Margaret Mackay (1802–1887), Scottish writer
- Margaret Mackie Morrison (1897–1973), British novelist
- Margaret Maclay Bogardus, American miniature painter
- Margaret Macnamara, British playwright
- Margaret Campbell Macpherson, Canadian painter
- Margaret MacPherson (1895–1974), New Zealand journalist, editor and writer
- Margaret Maddocks (1906–1993), British writer
- Margaret Mahy (1936–2012), New Zealand children's writer
- Margaret Malandruccolo, Canadian photographer and music video director
- Margaret Malcolm (1900–1980), British writer
- Margaret Mann (1868–1941), Scottish-American actress
- Margaret Manning (died 1984), American journalist
- Margaret Hartman Markoe Bache (1770–1836), American printer and editor
- Margaret Markov (born 1948), American actress
- Margaret Maron (1938–2021), American crime fiction writer
- Margaret Marquis (1919–1993), American actress
- Margaret Marshall Saunders (1861–1947), Canadian author
- Margaret Anne Marshall (born 1949), Scottish soprano
- Margaret Martyr (c. 1762–1807), British singer and actress
- Margaret Mascarenhas (died 2019), American novelist and poet
- Margaret Mason (1940–1999), American actress
- Margaret Matzenauer (1881–1963), American opera singer
- Margaret Maxwell Inglis (1774–1843), Scottish poet
- Margaret Mayo (novelist) (born 1936), British author of romance novels
- Margaret Mayo (playwright) (1882–1951), American playwright, actress and early screenwriter
- Margaret Mayo (children's author) (born 1935), British writer, mostly of children's books
- Margaret Mazzantini (born 1961), Italian-Irish author
- Margaret McBurney (1931–2018), Canadian writer
- Margaret Hill McCarter (1860–1938), American novelist
- Margaret McCartney, general practitioner, writer and broadcaster
- Margaret McClure Stitt (1886–1979), American dramatist
- Margaret McConnell Holt, American artist
- Margaret McDonald Bottome (1827–1906), American reformer, organizational founder, author
- Margaret McDonald (born 1988), American voice actress
- Margaret Dixon McDougall (1828–1899), Irish-born writer
- Margaret McWade (1871–1956), American actress
- Margaret Medlyn (born 1955), New Zealand soprano
- Margaret Mee (1909–1988), British botanical artist
- M. R. D. Meek (1918–2009), Scottish author
- Margaret Meen (1751–1834), British painter
- Margaret Mellis (1914–2009), British artist
- Margaret Ménégoz (1941–2024), French film producer
- Margaret Manton Merrill, British-American journalist, writer, translator, elocutionist
- Margaret Michaelis-Sachs (1902–1985), Australian photographer
- Margaret Michaels (born 1952), American actress
- Margaret Millar (1915–1994), American-Canadian writer
- Margaret Miller Brown (1903–1970), Canadian pianist and musical educator
- Margaret Mills, British stage actress
- Margaret Olive Milne-Redhead (1904–1997), British artist and botanical illustrator
- Margaret Milne (1917–2005), New Zealand potter
- Margaret Minifie (1734–1803), British writer
- Margaret Mitchell (photographer), Scottish photographer
- Margaret Mitchell (1900–1949), American author
- Margaret Modlin (1927–1998), American painter
- Margaret Moncrieff (1921–2008), Scottish cellist and author
- Margaret Prescott Montague (1878–1955), American novelist
- Margaret Moore (novelist) (born 1956), Canadian author
- Margaret Morris (actress) (1898–1968), American actress
- Margaret Morris (dancer) (1891–1980), British dancer, choreographer, artist and teacher
- Margaret Morrison, American fine art painter and professor
- Margaret Morton (1948–2020), American photographer
- Margaret Moscheles, British painter
- Margaret Moser (1954–2017), American music journalist
- Margaret Moth (1951–2010), New Zealand photojournalist
- Margaret Mulvihill (born 1954), Irish writer
- Margaret Murphy (born 1959), British crime writer
- Margaret "Ma" Murray (1888–1982), Canadian journalist and newspaper editor
- Margaret Nagle (born 1961), American film producer
- Margaret Nasmyth (1791–1869), Scottish painter
- Margaret Nichols (1930–2012), American animator and television director
- Margaret Nielsen (1933–2023), New Zealand pianist and music teacher
- Margaret Nisbett (1929–2023), Australian singer
- Margaret Graeme Niven (1906–1997), British artist
- Margaret Noble (born 1972), American conceptual artist
- Margaret Nolan (1943–2020), English model, actress and artist
- Margaret Noodin, American poet
- Margaret Ó hÓgartaigh (1967–2014), Irish author
- Margaret Obank, British publisher
- Margaret O'Brien (born 1937), American film, television and stage actress
- Margaret Ogden (born 1952), American fantasy author best known by the pen name Robin Hobb
- Margaret Ogola (1958–2011), Kenyan author
- Margaret Oliphant (1828–1897), Scottish author
- Margaret Olley (1923–2011), Australian artist
- Margaret Oppen (1890–1975), Australian artist
- Margaret Ortega (born 1993), Hong Kong singer
- Margaret Osborne, English actress
- Margaret Cushing Osgood, American writer and poet
- Margaret Packham Hargrave (born 1941), American poet and writer
- Margaret Paice (1920–2016), Australian children's writer and illustrator
- Margaret Paraskos, English-born artist
- Margaret Pardee (1920–2016), American violinist
- Margaret Pargeter (1925–2023), 20th century romance novelist
- Margaret Eleanor Parker (1827–1896), American social activist, social reformer, travel writer
- Margaret Colby Getchell Parsons (1891–1970), American writer
- Margaret Parton, American journalist
- Margaret Patrick, American musician
- Margaret Agnes Paul (1829–1905), Scottish novelist
- Margaret Bucknell Pecorini, American painter
- Margaret Pedler (1877–1948), British novelist
- Margaret Bloodgood Peeke (1838–1908), American traveler, lecturer, author
- Margaret Pellegrini (1923–2013), American actress, vaudeville performer and dancer
- Margaret Pennyman (bap. 1685–1733), English poet
- Margaret Peterson Haddix (born 1964), American writer
- Margaret Peterson (artist) (1902–1997), American artist
- Margaret Peterson (1883–1933), English novelist
- Margaret Philbrick (1914–1999), American artist
- Margaret Phillips (1923–1984), Welsh-born actress
- Margaret Pieroni, Western Australian botanical illustrator and artist
- Margaret Pilkington (1891–1974), British printmaker
- Margaret Pokiak-Fenton (1936–2021), Inuvialuk author
- Margaret Pomeranz (born 1944), Australian film critic
- Margaret Pospiech, Polish writer and filmmaker
- Margaret Potter (1926–1998), British writer
- Margaret Horton Potter (1881–1911), American novelist
- Margaret Powell (1907–1984), English writer
- Margaret Preece, British operatic soprano
- Margaret Press (born 1947), American novelist
- Margaret Preston (1875–1963), Australian artist
- Margaret Price (1941–2011), Welsh operatic soprano
- Margaret Purcell (1914–1991), American composer
- Margaret Quainoo (1941–2006), Ghanaian actress
- Margaret Qualley (born 1994), American actress
- Margaret Quimby (1904–1965), American actress
- Margaret Raia (1929–2003), American actress
- Margaret Randall (born 1936), American writer
- Margaret Rawlings (1906–1996), English actress
- Margaret Read MacDonald (born 1940), American writer
- Margaret Read (1905–1996), musical artist
- Margaret Renkl, American writer
- Margaret Rhee, American poet
- Margaret Foster Richardson (1881–1945), American painter
- Margaret Riley (1965–2024), American film and television producer
- Margaret Rinkovsky (born 1950), American landscape painter
- Margaret Rizza (born 1929), English composer
- Margaret Roach (1921–1964), American actress
- Margaret Roc (born 1945), Australian children's writer
- Margaret Agnes Rope (1882–1953), British stained glass artist
- Margaret Roper (1505–1544), English writer, translator
- Margaret Roscoe, English botanical illustrator and author
- Margaret Rose (1888–1958), English lyricist
- Margaret Rowlett, American writer and fabric designer
- Margaret Rutherford (1892–1972), British actress of the stage and screen
- Margaret Ryan (1944–2019), Scottish children's writer
- Margaret Ryder, British artist
- Margaret Salmon, American film director
- Margaret Sandbach (1812–1852), English poet and novelist
- Margaret Vardell Sandresky (born 1921), American composer
- Margaret Sangster (1894–1981), American writer
- Margaret Elizabeth Sangster (1838–1912), American author, poet, editor
- Margaret Santry (died 1975), American journalist and radio host
- Margaret Sarfo (1957–2014), Ghanaian author and journalist
- Margaret Holland Sargent (born 1927), American artist
- Margaret Saunders, British actress
- Margaret Scobie (born 1948), Australian indigenous Aboriginal painter
- Margaret Scott (Australian author) (1934–2005), Australian poet
- Margaret Scott (dancer) (1922–2019), Australian ballerina
- Margaret Scott (New Zealand author) (1928–2014), New Zealand author and Katherine Mansfield scholar
- Margaret Scoville (1944–c. 1978), American composer of chamber, electronic and piano music
- Margaret Ann Scruggs Carruth, 20th-century Texan artist
- Margaret Scudamore (1881–1958), British theatre and film actress
- Margaret Seddon (1872–1968), American actress
- Margaret Seguier (1795–1870), British miniature painter
- Margaret Senior (1917–1995), Australian wildlife illustrator
- Margaret Severin-Hansen, American ballerina
- Margaret Severn (1901–1997), American dancer
- Margaret Wilkerson Sexton, American novelist
- Margaret Shelby (1900–1939), American actress
- Margaret Shelton (1915–1984), Canadian artist
- Margaret Sheridan (actress) (1926–1982), American actress
- Margaret Sheridan (writer) (1912–1980), British writer
- Margaret Sherratt Keys (1856-1942), British-born American artist, china painter, store proprietor
- Margaret Shulock (1949–2021), American cartoonist
- Margaret Simons, Australian academic, journalist and author
- Margaret Singana (1938–2000), South African musician
- Margaret Sixel, Australian and South African film editor
- Margaret Skjelbred (born 1949), Norwegian writer
- Margaret Smith (comedian), American comedian and actress
- Margaret Smith (poet), American poet
- Margaret Bayard Smith (1778–1844), American writer
- Margaret Spicer-Simson (1874–1968), American artist
- Margaret St. Clair (1911–1995), American speculative fiction writer
- Margaret Stallard (born 1929), British actress
- Margaret Stanley-Wrench (1916–1974), English poet and novelist
- Margaret Starbird (born 1942), American writer
- Margaret Stevenson, Australian writer
- Margaret Stoddart (1865–1934), New Zealand artist
- Margaret Stohl, American author
- Margaret Stokes (1832–1900), Irish antiquarian
- Margaret Stones (1920–2018), Australian botanical illustrator
- Margaret Storey (1926–2022), British writer
- Margaret Stratton, American photographer and video artist
- Margaret Sullavan (1909–1960), American actress
- Margaret Frances Sullivan (1847–1903), Irish-American writer, journalist, editor
- Margaret Sullivan, American media columnist
- Margaret Sutermeister (1875–1950), American photographer
- Margaret Sutherland (1897–1984), Australian composer
- Margaret Sutton (1903–2001), American writer
- Margaret Jane Mussey Sweat (1823–1908), American poet
- Margaret Sweatman (born 1953), Canadian writer
- Margaret Tafoya (1904–2001), Native American potter
- Margaret Tait (1918–1999), Scottish filmmaker and poet
- Margaret Talbot, American essayist and non-fiction writer
- Margaret Tallichet (1914–1991), American actress
- Margaret Tarrant (1888–1959), English painter
- Margaret Taylor-Burroughs (1915–2010), American writer, artist and educator
- Margaret Tedesco (c. 1965–2025), American curator, visual artist and dancer
- Margaret Thomas (painter) (1916–2016), British painter
- Margaret Thomas (hymnwriter), Welsh hymnwriter
- Margaret Thomas (1842–1929), Australian writer, painter and sculptor
- Margaret Thomson (1910–2005), Australian-born documentary filmmaker
- Margaret Throsby, Australian radio broadcaster
- Margaret Tomkins (1916–2002), American painter
- Margaret Tomlinson (1905–1997), British photographer
- Margaret Towner (1920–2017), British actress
- Margaret Tracey (born 1967), American ballet dancer
- Margaret Traherne (1919–2006), British artist
- Margaret Travolta (born 1946), American actress
- Margaret Trist (1914–1986), Australian short story writer and novelist
- Margaret Truman (1924–2008), American writer and daughter of President Harry S. Truman
- Margaret Tu Chuan (1942–1969), Hong Kong actress
- Margaret Turnbull (1872–1942), Scottish screenwriter
- Margaret Tyler, English writer and translator
- Margaret Tynes (1919–2024), American opera singer
- Margaret Tyzack (1931–2011), British actress
- Margaret Urlich (1965–2022), New Zealand singer
- Margaret Vale (1878–1947), American actress
- Margaret Vance Shelley (1925–2008), American composer and music educator
- Margaret Vandercook (1877–1958), American writer
- Margaret Elizabeth Vanderhaeghe (1950–2012), Canadian artist
- Margaret Britton Vaughn, American poet
- Margaret Veley (1843–1887), British author and poet
- Margaret Rose Vendryes (1955–2022), Jamaican American visual artist
- Margaret Verble, American author
- Margaret Vines (1907–1997), British actress
- Margaret Visser (born 1940), Canadian writer and broadcaster
- Margaret Winifred Vowles (1882–1932), English author on science
- Margaret Vyner (1914–1993), Australian-born model and actress
- Margaret Walker (1915–1998), American author
- Margaret Walthour Lippitt (1872–1964), American painter and teacher
- Margaret Ward, Irish journalist
- Margaret E. Ward, Irish journalist
- Margaret Warner (born 1950), American journalist
- Margaret Helen Waterfield (1863–1953), English watercolor artist
- Margaret Way (1935–2022), Australian novelist
- Margaret Ely Webb (1877–1965), American illustrator
- Margaret Webster (1905–1972), American actress and director
- Margaret Weis (born 1948), American fantasy novelist
- Margaret Wendell Huntington, American painter
- Margaret Wente (born 1950), Canadian journalist
- Margaret Wertheim (born 1958), Australian science writer
- Margaret Wettlin (c. 1907–2003), American journalist
- Margaret Matilda White (1868–1910), New Zealand photographer
- Margaret Whiting (1924–2011), American popular music and country music singer
- Margaret Whiting (actress) (1936–2023), British actress
- Margaret C. Whiting (1860–1946), American artist
- Margaret Whitton (1949–2016), American actress
- Margaret Whyte (born 1940), Uruguayan artist
- Margaret Widdemer (1884–1978), American poet and novelist
- Margaret Jones Wiles (1911–2000), American composer, conductor and violinist
- Margaret Wetherby Williams (1901–1984), British mystery writer
- Margaret Wild, Australian children's writer
- Margaret Lindsay Williams (1888–1960), Welsh artist
- Margaret Williams (1950–2024), British film director
- Margaret Wilson (novelist) (1882–1973), American novelist
- Margaret Wilson (Australian writer), Australian television writer
- Margaret J. Winkler (1895–1990), American film producer
- Margaret Winser (c. 1868–1944), English sculptor and artist
- Margaret E. Winslow (1836–1936), American activist, editor, author
- Margaret Wise Brown (1910–1952), American author
- Margaret Ann Withers (born 1965), American painter, sculptor and poet
- Margaret Withers (1893–1977), British actress
- Margaret Wolfe Hungerford (1855–1897), Irish novelist
- Margaret Wolfson, American storyteller and writer
- Margaret Louisa Woods (1855–1945), English novelist and poet
- Margaret Worth, Australian artist
- Margaret Jane Wray, American dramatic soprano
- Margaret Wrightson, English artist
- Margaret Wrinkle, American novelist
- Margaret Wycherly (1881–1956), English stage and film actress
- Margaret Wylie, Western Australian author
- Margaret Wynne Lawless (1847–1926), American poet, author, educator, philanthropist
- Margaret Yarde (1878–1944), British actress
- Margaret Yorke (1924–2012), English crime fiction writer
- Margaret Young (1891–1969), American singer
- Margaret Zhang, Australian fashion editor
- Margaret Scully Zimmele (1872–1964), American artist
- Meg Stuart (born 1965), American choreographer, dancer, performing artist

== Education, science, and technology ==
- Margaret, Lady Moir (1864–1942), founding member of the Women's Engineering Society, Scotland
- Margaret Abraham, professor of sociology
- Margaret Ackerman, American engineer
- Margaret F. Alexander, Scottish nurse, educator, researcher and writer
- Margaret Alington (1920–2012), New Zealand historian
- Margaret Allemang (1914–2005), Canadian nurse and academic
- Margaret Allen (surgeon) (born 1948), American surgeon and academic
- Margaret Allen (born 1947), Australian historian
- Margaret Alston-Garnjost (1929–2019), British physicist
- Margaret Altmann (1900–1984), German-American biologist
- Margaret Amidon (1827–1869), American educator
- Margaret Amosu (1920–c. 2005), British-Nigerian librarian
- Margaret Anderson (1900–c. 1997), British biochemist and scientific indexer
- Margaret L. Anderson (born 1941), American historian
- Margaret Andrew (1908–2000), American experimental engineer
- Margaret Archer (1943–2023), English sociologist
- Margaret Armstrong, Australian geostatistician
- Margaret Ashley-Towle (1902/1903–1985), American archaeologist
- Margaret Aston (1932–2014), British historian and academic
- Margaret Atack (1948–2023), scholar of French literature and academic
- Margaret Atherton (born 1943), American historian
- Margaret Baird (1945–2016), New Zealand immunologist
- Margaret Barker, British biblical scholar
- Margaret Barnes (1919–2009), British marine biologist
- Margaret Baron (c. 1915–1996), British mathematics educator and history of mathematics
- Margaret Elizabeth Barr-Bigelow (1923–2008), Canadian mycologist
- Margaret Scolari Barr, American art historian
- Margaret Stuart Barry (1927–2022), British writer
- Margaret Bastock (1920–1982), British biologist
- Margaret Battin (born 1940), philosopher and medical scientist
- Margaret Bayer, American mathematician
- Margaret Bayne Wilson (1775–1835), British missionary
- Margaret Becklake (1922–2018), Canadian academic and epidemiologist
- Margaret Armstrong Beckman (1925–2008), Canadian librarian
- Margaret Belcher (1936–2016), New Zealand literary scholar
- Margaret Bell Douglas (1880–1963), Canadian botanist and horticulturalist
- Margaret Bemister (1877–1984), Canadian writer and educator
- Margaret Bender, American anthropologist
- Margaret Bennell (1893–1966), British educator, adult educator and anthroposophist
- Margaret Jane Benson (1859–1936), English botanist
- Margaret Benston, Canadian scientist and feminist
- Margaret A. Berger (1932–2010), professor of Law at Brooklyn Law School
- Margaret Berry (1832–1918), Australian educationalist
- Margaret Beznak (c. 1914–1999), Hungarian-born Canadian medical researcher
- Margaret Billingham (1930–2009), Kenyan-born American pathologist
- Margaret Birley (1910–2000), British archaeologist
- Margaret Katherine Black (1921–1999), food historian and author
- Margaret B. Blackman, American anthropologist
- Margaret Blackwood (1909–1986), Australian botanist and geneticist
- Margaret Boden (born 1936), researcher in the field of artificial intelligence
- Margaret G. Bradbury (1927–2010), American ichthyologist
- Margaret Bradford Boni (1892–1974), American educator
- Margaret E. Bradshaw (born 1926), British botanist and conservationist
- Margaret Bradshaw (born 1941), British-born New Zealand geologist
- Margaret Brandeau, American management scientist and engineer
- Margaret Brazier (1950–2025), British academic
- Margaret W. "Hap" Brennecke, American metallurgist
- Margaret Briggs, New Zealand law professor
- Margaret Brimble (born 1961), New Zealand chemist
- Margaret Bromhall (1890–1967), English radio therapist
- Margaret Sibella Brown (1866–1961), Canadian botanist
- Margaret Brown (ichthyologist) (1918–2009), British ichthyologist
- Margaret Brown (mathematics educator), British mathematics educator
- Margaret Bryan (c. 1759–1836), British natural philosopher and educator
- Margaret M. Bryant (1900–1993), American linguist
- Margaret Buchanan Cole (1885–1959), American mathematician
- Margaret Elizabeth Buchanan (1865–1940), British pharmacist
- Margaret Buckingham (born 1945), French-British biologist
- Margaret Bullock (1933–2026), Australian academic
- Margaret Burbidge (1919–2020), British astronomer
- Margaret Burchinal (born 1951), quantitative psychologist
- Margaret Burnett (born 1949), American computer scientist
- Margaret F. Butler (1861–1931), American physician
- Margaret K. Butler (1924–2013), American mathematician
- Margaret Byers (1832–1912), Irish educator, activist, social reformer, missionary, writer
- Margaret Byrne, Australian geneticist
- Margaret Callahan, American nursing administrator
- Margaret Cameron (1937–2023), Australian amateur ornithologist, librarian and educator
- Margaret Cameron, Canadian philosopher
- Margaret C. Campbell, American marketing academic
- Margaret I. Carman (1890–1976), American teacher and historian
- Margaret Carnegie Miller (1897–1990), American philanthropist
- Margaret Carr, New Zealand early childhood education academic
- Margaret Chan (born 1947), Chinese-Canadian physician
- Margaret Cheney (mathematician) (born 1955), American mathematician
- Margaret E. Chisholm (1921–1999), American librarian and educator
- Margaret Chung (1889–1959), American-born Chinese female physician
- Margaret Church (1889–1976), American mycologist
- Margaret Clapp (1910–1974), American educator
- Margaret Clark, American historian, writer and educator
- Margaret Clark (born 1941), New Zealand political scientist
- Margaret Clark, American psychologist
- Margaret Cleaves (1848–1917), American physician
- Margaret Clement (1508–1570), English mathematician
- Margaret C. Cobb (1892–1975), American geologist
- Margaret V. Cobb, educational psychologist
- Margaret Coel (born 1937), American historian and mystery writer
- Margaret Coit (1919–2003), American historian
- Margaret S. Collins (1922–1996), African-American child prodigy and entomologist
- Margaret Collinson, paleobotanist
- Margaret Colquhoun (1947–2017), evolutionary biologist
- Margaret P. Colvin (1820–1894), 19th-century inventor
- Margaret Conkey, American archaeologist
- Margaret Conrad, Canadian historian
- Margaret Darst Corbett (1889–1962), American vision educator
- Margaret Georgina Corrick (1922–2020), Australian botanist
- Margaret Cote (1950–2021), Canadian academic and author
- Margaret Cox (born 1939), English physicist
- Margaret Craighill (1898–c. 1977), American psychiatrist
- Margaret Crane, American biochemist
- Margaret Creighton, American historian
- Margaret Crofoot (born 1980), American anthropologist
- Margaret Crosby (1902–1972), American classical archaeologist
- Margaret Crosfield (1859–1952), British paleontologist
- Margaret Mordecai Jones Cruikshank (1878–1955), American educator and college president
- Margaret Cruickshank (1873–1918), New Zealand medical practitioner
- Margaret Crum (1921–1986), British scholar of English poetry and music
- Margaret Cuninggim (1914–1986), American university professor and administrator
- Margaret Cuomo (born 1955), American radiologist
- Margaret Dalziel (1916–2003), English literature scholar
- Margaret Daube-Witherspoon, American biomedical engineer
- Margaret A. Davidson (1950–2017), American scientist
- Margaret M. Davies (born 1944), Australian herpetologist
- Margaret Davies (1914–1982), English conservationist and archaeologist
- Margaret Davis Bowen (1894–1976), American educator
- Margaret Bryan Davis (1931–2024), American paleoecologist
- Margaret Oakley Dayhoff (1925–1983), American biophysicist
- Margaret Deanesly (1885–1977), English historian
- Margaret Defeyter, British psychologist
- Margaret Delaney, marine biologist
- Margaret Dick (1918–2008), Australian microbiologist
- Margaret A. Dix (1939–2025), British botanist
- Margaret Dix (1902–1991), British neurologist
- Margaret Donaldson (1926–2020), British psychologist
- Margaret Stefana Drower (1911–2012), British Egyptologist
- Margaret Dryburgh (1890–1945), English educator
- Margaret A. Edwards (1902–1988), American librarian
- Margaret Elizabeth Egan (1905–1959), American librarian
- Margaret Ensign Lewis (1919–2017), American botanist
- Margaret J. Eppstein, American complex systems scientist
- Margaret Escott (1908–1977), New Zealand novelist, drama teacher and poet
- Margaret C. Etter (1943–1992), American chemist and crystallographer
- Margaret Fairlie, British gynecologist
- Margaret Faul, Irish American chemist
- Margaret Faull (born 1946), Australian archaeologist and museum director
- Margaret Elisabeth Felix (born 1937), Indian educator
- Margaret Ferguson (born 1968), American political scientist
- Margaret Clay Ferguson (1863–1951), American botanist
- Margaret M. H. Finch (1878–1958), American historian
- Margaret Fischl, American physician
- Margaret Fishenden (1889–1977), British meteorologist
- Margaret Flamsteed, English astronomer
- Margaret Florey, Australian linguist
- Margaret Floy Washburn (1871–1939), American psychologist
- Margaret D. Foster (1895–1970), American chemist
- Margaret Fountaine (1862–1940), British entomologist, scientific illustrator and diarist
- Margaret R. Fox (1916–2006), American electronics engineer
- Margaret Frame, Scottish scientist, professor of molecular cell biology
- Margaret B. Freeman (c. 1899–1980), American museum curator
- Margaret Friedel, Australian scientist
- Margaret Hannah Fulford (1904–1999), American botanist
- Margaret B. Fuller Boos (1892–1978), American geologist
- Margaret T. Fuller, American developmental biologist
- Margaret Gamalo, Filipino-American biostatistician and drug development executive
- Margaret Gardel, American biophysicist
- Margaret Gardner (born 1954), Governor of Victoria
- Margaret Garritsen de Vries (1922–2009), American economist
- Margaret Garson (1927–2020), Australian cytogeneticist, pathologist and educator
- Margaret Gatz, American psychologist, gerontologist and researcher
- Margaret Geller (born 1947), American astrophysicist
- Margaret Gelling (1924–2009), English toponymist
- Margaret George, American historical novelist
- Margaret Giannini (1921–2021), American physician
- Margaret Dunlop Gibson (1843–1920), British orientalist
- Margaret Gibson (1938–1994), British medieval historian and academic
- Margaret Clark Gillett, British botanist
- Margaret Sylvia Gilliland (1917–1990), Australian biochemist
- Margaret Glyn (1865–1946), English music historian
- Margaret Goodell (born 1965), American scientist
- Margaret Gowing (1921–1998), English historian
- Margaret Dorothy Green, British nurse and educator
- Margaret Cicely Langton Greene (1913–2007), British speech and language therapist
- Margaret Greig (1922–1999), English mathematician
- Margaret Grey Porter, Irish philanthropist
- Margaret Storrs Grierson (1900–1997), American archivist and philosophy professor
- Margaret E. Grigsby (1923–2009), African-American physician
- Margaret Grimshaw (1905–1990), English mathematician
- Margaret Gurney (1908–2002), American mathematician, statistician, and computer programmer
- Margaret Jarman Hagood (1907–1963), statistician, sociologist and demographer
- Margaret Haley (1861–1939), American educator, promoted teacher's unions
- Margaret Hamburg (born 1955), American public health administrator
- Margaret Hamilton Storey (1900–1960), U. S. zoologist
- Margaret Hamilton (software engineer) (1936–2026), American computer scientist
- Margaret Hamilton (educator) (1871–1969), teacher
- Margaret Hamilton (nurse) (1840–1922), American nurse
- Margaret Irving Handy (1889–1977), American pediatrician
- Margaret Murray Hanson, American astronomer and educator
- Margaret Harding (born 1960), Australian scientist
- Margaret Hurlstone Hardy Fallding (1920–2004), developmental biologist
- Margaret Hilda Harper (1879–1964), Australian pediatrician
- Margaret Helen Harper (1919–2014), American computer programmer
- Margaret Harvey (c. 1768–1858), English poet and scholar
- Margaret Harwood (1885–1979), American astronomer
- Margaret Gentle Harwood, British educator
- Margaret Hastings (1910–1979), American medievalist
- Margaret Haughery, American philanthropist
- Margaret Fordyce Dalrymple Hay (1889–1975), Australian University of Sydney Law School administrator
- Margaret Hayes Grazier (1916–1999), American librarian
- Margaret Hayes-Robinson (1876–1930), British historian
- Margaret Hayman (1923–1994), British mathematics educator
- Margaret Heavey (1907–1980), Irish polyglot and classics scholar
- Margaret Heffernan (born 1944), Australian indigenous linguist, author and interpreter
- Margaret Henson (1924–2001), American historian
- Margaret Hermann (born 1938), American political psychologist
- Margaret Herrick (1902–1976), American librarian
- Margaret Hewett (1934–2022), South African academic and author
- Margaret Hewitt (1928–1991), British sociologist
- Margaret Hodgen (1890–1977), American sociologist
- Margaret Holden (1920–1998), British botanist, biochemist
- Margaret Holtrust (1925–2011), Dutch-American political scientist
- Margaret Horsburgh, New Zealand academic
- Margaret Hotchkiss, American microbiologist
- Margaret Howe Lovatt, naturalist
- Margaret Hubbard (1924–2011), British classical philologist
- Margaret Hume (1887–1968), English nutritionist
- Margaret Hunt Hill (1915–2007), American philanthropist and heiress
- Margaret Hutchins (1884–1961), American librarian and educator
- Margaret Hutchinson (1904–1997), English educator, naturalist and author
- Margaret Hyland, New Zealand chemist and professor
- Margaret Ingels (1892–1971), mechanical engineer
- Margaret Ives (1903–2000), American psychologist
- Margaret Jackson (1898–1987), family planning pioneer
- Margaret Jacob, American historian of science
- Margaret D. Jacobs (born 1963), American historian
- Margaret Jacobsohn, Namibian environmentalist
- Margaret Janeway (1896–1981), American physician
- Margaret Jennings (1904–1994), British scientist
- Margaret Johnson, British physician
- Margaret Jolly (born 1949), Australian anthropologist
- Margaret Ursula Jones (1916–2001), British archaeologist
- Margaret Jope, British biochemist and archaeologist
- Margaret Karembu, Kenyan science communication specialist and biotechnology advocate
- Margaret J. Kartomi, Australian ethnomusicologist
- Margaret Keay (1911–1998), South African-born British plant pathologist
- Margaret Keck (born 1949), American political scientist
- Margaret Keenan Harrais (1872–1964), American educator; first woman superintendent of schools in Fairbanks, Alaska
- Margaret Kelly (1906–1968), American pharmacologist
- Margaret Kennard (1899–1975), American neuropsychologist
- Margaret Keyes (1918–2015), American historian and educator
- Margaret Kidwell (born 1933), American biologist
- Margaret L. King, American historian of the Italian Renaissance
- Margaret King Robinson (1906–2006), American oceanographer
- Margaret G. Kivelson (born 1928), American geophysicist and planetary scientist
- Margaret E. Knight (1838–1914), American inventor
- Margaret L. Kripke, American immunologist
- Margaret Kuenne Harlow (1918–1971), American developmental psychologist
- Margaret Wade Labarge (1916–2009), Canadian historian
- Margaret Ladipo (born 1961), Nigerian academic and researcher
- Margaret Heather Laird (1933–2014), British teacher and senior laywoman
- Margaret Langdon (1926–2005), Native American languages and linguist
- Margaret Lartey, Ghanaian professor
- Margaret Law (1928–2017), British engineer
- Margaret Lawder (1899–1982), Irish and South African botanist
- Margaret Morgan Lawrence (1914–2019), American psychiatrist
- Margaret Leech (1893–1974), American historian and novelist
- Margaret Leinen (born 1946), American scientist
- Margaret Anne LeMone (born 1946), atmospheric scientist
- Margaret Lemos, American legal scholar
- Margaret Leshikar-Denton, marine archaeologist and museum director
- Margaret Campbell Mann Lesley (1891–1988), American cytologist and geneticist
- Margaret Levenstein, American economist
- Margaret Levi, American political scientist
- Margaret Levyns (1890–1975), South African phytogeographer, botanist and taxonomist
- Margaret Reed Lewis (1881–1970), American cell biologist
- Margaret Lewis, Canadian paleontologist and professor
- Margaret Lin Xavier (1898–1932), Thai physician
- Margaret Lindsay Huggins (1848–1915), Irish astronomer
- Margaret Little (1901–1994), British psychoanalyst
- Margaret A. Liu (born 1956), physician scientist
- Margaret Livingstone (born 1950), American neuroscientist
- Margaret Lock (born 1936), Canadian anthropologist
- Margaret Loutit (1929–2020), New Zealand microbiologist
- Margaret D. Lowman (born 1953), American biologist and ecologist
- Margaret Lucas, Scottish mechanical engineer
- Margaret Mac Curtain (1929–2020), Irish historian, writer, nun and educator
- Margaret MacDonald, British analytic philosopher
- Margaret MacLean, British pulmonary pharmacologist
- Margaret MacMillan (born 1943), Canadian historian
- Margaret Macpherson Grant (1834–1877), Scottish philanthropist
- Margaret MacPherson (1875–1956), Australian pharmacist and benefactor
- Margaret Maden (born 1940), British educationalist
- Margaret Mahler, Austrian-born American psychiatrist and psychoanalyst
- Margaret Majer (1898–1990), American women's physical education instructor
- Margaret Malamud, professor of Ancient History and Islamic Studies at New Mexico State University
- Margaret Eliza Maltby (1860–1944), American physicist
- Margaret Manion (1935–2024), Australian art historian and curator
- Margaret Marrs (1929–2022), English computer programmer
- Margaret Trevena Martin (1905–2000), British botanist
- Margaret E. Martin (1912–2012), American economist and statistician
- Margaret P. Martin (1915–2012), American statistician
- Margaret Martonosi, American computer scientist
- Margaret Maruani (1954–2022), French sociologist
- Margaret Masson, British academic
- Margaret Masterman (1910–1986), British linguist and philosopher
- Margaret Evelyn Mauch (1897–1987), American mathematician, professor
- Margaret T. May, British health sciences modeler
- Margaret Mayall (1902–1995), American astronomer
- Margaret McArthur, Australian nutritional anthropologist
- Margaret McCarthy (born 1958), American neuroscientist and pharmacologist
- Margaret E. McCully, Canadian psychologist, microbiologist and plant biologist
- Margaret McFall-Ngai, American animal physiologist and biochemist
- Margaret McFarland (1905–1988), American psychologist
- Margaret M. McGowan (1931–2022), British historian of dance and France
- Margaret McLarty (1908–1996), British medical illustrator
- Margaret McLeod (1915–1993), Canadian teacher
- Margaret McNamara (1915–1981), American educator and nonprofit executive; wife of Robert McNamara
- Margaret Stovel McWilliams (1875–1952), Canadian historian
- Margaret Mead (1901–1978), American anthropologist
- Margaret Meek Spencer (1925–2020), British educationalist
- Margaret Melhase (1919–2006), American chemistry student and co-discoverer of cesium-137
- Margaret di Menna (1923–2014), New Zealand microbiologist
- Margaret Menzel (1924–1987), American geneticist
- Margaret Merrell (1900–1995), American biostatistician
- Margaret A. Meyer (born 1959), British economist
- Margaret Meyer (1862–1924), British mathematical astronomer
- Margaret R. Miles (born 1937), American theologian and historian
- Margaret Shandor Miles, American pediatric nurse
- Margaret C. Miller, classical archaeologist
- Margaret Millington (1944–1973), British mathematician
- Margaret Mills (born 1946), American folklorist
- Margaret Mitchell, American computer scientist
- Margaret M. Mitchell, American biblical scholar and professor of early Christianity
- Margaret Howell Mitchell (1901–1988), Canadian ornithologist
- Margaret W. Moodey (1862–1948), American scientific curator
- Margaret Moore, Canadian political theorist
- Margaret S. Morley (1938–2016), New Zealand malacologist and museum curator
- Margaret Warner Morley (1858–1923), American educator, biologist and author
- Margaret Shove Morriss (1884–1975), American academic historian
- Margaret Morrison (1954–2021), Canadian philosopher
- Margaret Morse, former professor at the University of California
- Margaret Veronica Moses (1940–1975), Australian teacher and orphanage administrator
- Margaret Mulholland, marine biogeochemist
- Margaret Mullett, British historian
- Margaret Mungherera (1957–2017), Ugandan physician
- Margaret Munn-Rankin (1913–1981), British archaeologist and historian
- Margaret Murie (1902–2003), American naturalist and author
- Margaret Murnane (born 1959), Irish physicist
- Margaret Murray Washington (1865–1925), American academic
- Margaret Murray (1863–1963), Anglo-Indian academic, Egyptologist, archaeologist, anthropologist and folklorist.
- Margaret Muthwii (born 1957), Kenyan academic administrator
- Margaret Mutu, Ngāti Kahu leader, author and academic
- Margaret Good Myers (1899–1988), American economist
- Margaret Naumburg (1890–1983), American psychologist
- Margaret Ann Neale, American management academic
- Margaret F. Nelson (1922–2018), American Cherokee academic
- Margaret Ellen Newell (born 1962), American historian
- Margaret Newman (1933–2018), American nursing theorist
- Margaret Newton (1887–1971), Canadian phytopathologist and mycologist
- Margaret Morse Nice (1883–1974), American ornithologist
- Margaret Nygard (1925–1995), British educator and conservationist
- Margaret O'Flynn (1920–2014), British gynecologist
- Margaret A. Ohlson (1901–1996), American dietitian and writer
- Margaret O'Mahony, Irish civil engineer
- Margaret O'Mara (born 1970), American historian and professor
- Margaret Orbell (1935–2006), New Zealand author, editor and academic
- Margaret Ormsby (1909–1996), Canadian historian
- Margaret Orr, American meteorologist
- Margaret Osler (1942–2010), Canadian historian and philosopher
- Margaret Owen (1930–2014), English farmer and gardener
- Margaret A. Palmer, American ecologist
- Margaret Park Redfield (1898–1977), American anthropologist
- Margaret Parkes (1925–2007), British educationist
- Margaret Partridge (1891–1967), electrical engineer
- Margaret Sullivan Pepe (born 1961), Irish biostatistician
- Margaret Pereira (1928–2016), British forensic scientist
- Margaret Pericak-Vance (born 1951), American human geneticist
- Margaret M. Perry, British molecular geneticist and embryology researcher
- Margaret A. Phillips (born 1959), American biologist
- Margaret Pittman (1901–1995), American bacteriologist
- Margaret Plant, Australian art historian
- Margaret Plass (1896–1990), American anthropologist and collector
- Margaret Plues, English botanist
- Margaret Una Poché (1912–1982), American educator
- Margaret Poloma (born 1943), American sociologist
- Margaret Price, American academic
- Margaret Priest, Canadian artist and educator
- Margaret Jane Radin (born 1941), American legal scholar
- Margaret Ransone Murray (1901–1986), American biologist
- Margaret Byrd Rawson (1899–2001), American dyslexia expert, educator and psychologist
- Margaret Rayner (1929–2019), British mathematician
- Margaret Helen Read (1889–1991), British social anthropologist and academic
- Margaret Hiza Redsteer, Crow Nation geomorphologist and professor
- Margaret Reeson, Australian historian
- Margaret G. Reid (1896–1991), economist
- Margaret Reid, Australian physicist
- Margaret Rioch (1907–1996), American psychotherapist
- Margaret C. Roberts (1846–1926), American obstetrician
- Margaret E. Roberts, American political scientist
- Margaret M. Robinson, American mathematician
- Margaret Rock (1903–1983), British crypto-analyst
- Margaret Rockefeller (1915–1996), conservationist
- Margaret Rogers (1887–1915), New Zealand nurse
- Margaret S. Rood (1908–1984), American occupational therapist
- Margaret Cool Root, American professor
- Margaret Rosario, American psychologist
- Margaret Ross, British computer scientist
- Margaret W. Rossiter (born 1943), American historian
- Margaret Hutchinson Rousseau (1910–2000), American chemical engineer
- Margaret Joyce Rowe (1926–2020), British historian
- Margaret Rule (1928–2015), British archaeologist
- Margaret Sabine (1928–2011), Australian virologist
- Margaret J. Safrit (1935–2023), American college professor
- Margaret Samu, art historian specializing in Russian art
- Margaret Sandford (1839–1903), English headmistress and author
- Margaret Satterthwaite (born 1969), American special rapporteur
- Margaret Schabas, Canadian philosopher
- Margaret Schoeninger, American anthropologist
- Margaret Scott-Wright (1923–2008), British nurse and academic
- Margaret Seltzer (born 1975), American writer
- Margaret Seward (1864–1929), British chemist
- Margaret Sewell (1852–1937), English educator
- Margaret Sharpe, Australian linguist
- Margaret Fay Shaw (1903–2004), American folklorist
- Margaret Shea, space scientist
- Margaret Sheil, Australian academic
- Margaret Pollock Sherwood (1864–1955), American literary scholar and writer
- Margaret Shipp, American oncologist
- Margaret Simms, 21st-century American economist
- Margaret E. B. Simpson (1906–1994), Scottish archaeologist
- Margaret P. Sinclair, Canadian mathematics educator
- Margaret Singer (1921–2003), American clinical psychologist
- Margaret Slade, Canadian economist
- Margaret Patrice Slattery (1926–2024), American college professor
- Margaret Smagorinsky (1915–2011), American meteorologist
- Margaret Smith (1884–1970), British writer and scholar
- Margaret Gladys Smith (1896–1970), American pathologist
- Margaret Keiver Smith, American psychologist
- Margaret C. Snyder (1929–2021), American social scientist
- Margaret Somerville (born 1942), professor of Bioethics at University of Notre Dame Australia
- Margaret Sordahl, naturalist for the Smithsonian Astrophysical Observatory
- Margaret Adebisi Sowunmi (born 1939), Nigerian botanist and environmental archaeologist
- Margaret Bailey Speer (1900–1997), American educator
- Margaret Beale Spencer, American academic
- Margaret Spittle (born 1939), British oncologist
- Margaret Spufford (1935–2014), British social historian
- Margaret Stacey (1922–2004), British sociologist
- Margaret Stanley (virologist), British virologist
- Margaret Evelyn Stanley (1875–1964), British philanthropist
- Margaret Stanley (ecologist), New Zealand ecologist
- Margaret Stansfeld (1860–1951), British teacher, educator and Principal of Bedford Physical Training College
- Margaret Stewart (1927–2006), American herpetologist
- Margaret Bingham Stillwell (1887–1984), American librarian and bibliographer
- Margaret Stonborough-Wittgenstein (1882–1958), Austrian philanthropist
- Margaret Alison Stones, British academic
- Margaret Storkan (1919–2000), American dermatologist and clinical professor of dermatology
- Margaret Stoughton Abell (1908–2004), American forester
- Margaret Strobel, American historian
- Margaret Taber (1935–2015), American electrical engineer
- Margaret Alison Telfer (1904–1974), Australian university administrator
- Margaret Tennant, New Zealand historian
- M. B. W. Tent (1944–2014), American mathematics educator and writer
- Margaret E. Thompson (1911–1992), American numismatist
- Margaret W. Thompson (1920–2014), Canadian geneticist
- Margaret Thorsborne (1927–2018), Australian naturalist
- Margaret Tisdale (c. 1951–2015), Welsh clinical virologist
- Margaret Titcomb (1891–1982), American librarian and writer
- Margaret Julia Tobin (1952–2002), Australian psychiatrist
- Margaret Todd (1859–1918), Scottish medical doctor, schoolteacher and writer
- Margaret A. Tolbert, American atmospheric chemist
- Margaret Tolbert (born 1943), American chemist
- Margaret Torn, biogeochemist
- Margaret Trask (1928–2002), Australian librarian and academic
- Margaret A. Tucker, American oncologist and physician scientist
- Margaret Tupper True (1858–1926), American educator
- Margaret Turnbull, American astronomer
- Margaret Kemarre Turner (1938–2023), Arrernte linguist
- Margaret Turner-Warwick (1924–2017), British medical doctor and thoracic specialist
- Margaret Urban Walker (born 1948), American philosopher and academic
- Margaret Valadian (1936–2023), Australian Aboriginal educator
- Margaret Verrall (1857–1916), English parapsychologist
- Margaret Mary Vojtko (1930–2013), American linguist, educator, polyglot and labor unionist
- Margaret C. Waites (1883–1923), American classical scholar
- Margaret Sellers Walker (1935–2020), American state and city official
- Margaret Waller, American French literature scholar
- Margaret Walshaw (born 1950), New Zealand education academic
- Margaret Warner Morley (1858–1923), American biologist, wrote children's books on biology
- Margaret Weir (born 1952), American sociologist and political scientist
- Margaret Werner-Washburne, American molecular biologist
- Margaret Weston (1926–2021), British director of the Science Museum, curator and electrical engineer
- Margaret Wetherell (born 1954), New Zealand academic
- Margaret Wheat (1908–1988), American anthropologist
- Margaret Collingridge Wheeler (1916–1990), Australian archaeologist
- Margaret Whinney (1897–1975), English art historian
- Margaret Moore White (1902–1983), English gynecologist
- Margaret Whitehead (born 1948), British public health official
- Margaret Whyte (1868–1946), Australian medical doctor
- Margaret Wiecek, Polish-American operations researcher
- Margaret A. Wilcox (1838–1912), American inventor
- Margaret Wileman (1908–2014), British academic administrator and lecturer
- Margaret Williamson Rea (c. 1875–1954), Irish botanist
- Margaret Willerding (1919–2003), American mathematician
- Margaret Dauler Wilson (1939–1998), American philosopher
- Margaret Wood Bancroft (1893–1986), American naturalist and explorer
- Margaret Wood, British archaeologist
- Margaret Woodhouse (1927–1990), Australian bookseller
- Margaret Wooldridge, American combustion engineer
- Margaret H. Wright (born 1944), American computer scientist and applied mathematician
- Margaret Wu, Australian statistician and psychometrician
- Margaret C. Wu, American biostatistician
- Margaret M. Wu (born 1950), Taiwanese-American industrial chemist and inventor
- Margaret Buckner Young (1921–2009), American educator and author
- Margaret Paulin Young (1864–1953), Scottish educator
- Margaret Zacharin, Australian endocrinologist and academic
- Margaret A. Zahn, American sociologist and criminologist

== Politics and activists ==
- Margaret Abela (born 1949), 8th First Lady of Malta
- Margaret Ackman (died 2013), Guyanese politician
- Margaret Adamson, Australian diplomat
- Margaret Aldersley, British suffragist and feminist
- Margaret Aldrich Smith (1863–1929), American First Lady of Guam
- Margaret Aachilla Aleper (born 1963), Ugandan politician
- Margaret Alva (born 1942), Indian politician
- Margaret Amoakohene (born 1960), Ghanaian academic and diplomat
- Margaret Anderson Kelliher (born 1968), American politician
- Margaret Dawn Anderson (born 1967), Canadian politician
- Margaret Arney (born 1969), American politician
- Margaret Ashton (1856–1937), English suffragist, politician, pacifist and philanthropist
- Margaret Auld (1932–2010), Scottish nurse, Matron and Chief Nursing Officer
- Margaret Austin (born 1933), New Zealand politician
- Margaret Baba Diri (1954–2025), Ugandan politician
- Margaret Backhouse (1887–1977), British humanitarian activist
- Margaret Ballinger (1894–1980), South African politician
- Margaret H. Barden, was a New Hampshire state legislator
- Margaret Barkley, American politician
- Margaret Bazley (born 1938), New Zealand public servant
- Margaret Beazley (born 1951), Governor of South New Wales
- Margaret Beckett (born 1943), British Member of Parliament for Derby South
- Margaret Behan (born 1948), American activist
- Margaret Birch (1921–2020), Canadian politician
- Margaret Blackwood (1924–1994), Scottish activist
- Margaret Catherine Blaikie (1823–1915), Scottish temperance reformer
- Margaret Bloodworth, Canadian lawyer and civil servant
- Margaret Bondfield (1873–1953), first woman Cabinet minister in the United Kingdom
- Margaret Bridgman (1940–2009), Canadian politician
- Margaret Bryan (born 1929), British diplomat
- Margaret Buckley (1879–1962), Irish politician
- Margaret Burgess (born 1949), Scottish politician
- Margaret Campbell (1912–1999), Canadian politician
- Margaret W. Campbell (1827–1908), American suffragist
- Margaret Carpenter (born 1950), American politician
- Margaret Carter (born 1935), American politician
- Margaret Chant-Papandreou (born 1923), Greek-American politician
- Margaret Chase (1905–1997), American Red Cross worker
- Margaret Chase Smith (1897–1995), was the first woman to serve in both houses of the United States Congress, and the first woman to represent Maine in either.
- Margaret Cheney (born 1952), American politician
- Margaret Chin (born 1953), American politician
- Margaret Clarke (born 1940), former High Sheriff Belfast
- Margaret Clarke-Kwestie, Ghanaian politician
- Margaret (Ann) Coffey (born 1946), former British Member of Parliament for Stockport
- Margaret Collins-O'Driscoll (1876–1945), Irish politician
- Margaret Commodore, Canadian politician
- Margaret Conditt (born 1953), American politician
- Margaret Conlon (born 1967), Irish former politician
- Margaret Coughlin (1912–1996), American politician
- Margaret Cousins (1878–1954) Irish-Indian suffragist who established All India Women's Conference (AIWC)
- Margaret Cox (born 1963), Irish politician
- Margaret Craven, American politician
- Margaret Croke, American politician
- Margaret Brackenbury Crook (1886–1972), British Unitarian minister, a women's suffrage and peace activist
- Margaret Crooks (died 2014), former deputy Lord Mayor of Belfast
- Margaret Curran (born 1958), former British Member of Parliament for Glasgow East
- Margaret Currin, American lawyer
- Margaret L. Curry (1898–1986), American parole officer and social worker
- Margaret Daly (born 1938), British Conservative Party politician
- Margaret Davidson (1871–1964), British wife of colonial governor of New South Wales, Australia
- Margaret Davidson (suffragist) (1879–1978), Scottish suffragist, teacher and WW1 nurse
- Margaret A. Davidson (1950–2017), American lawyer and coastal science pioneer
- Margaret Davis (1933–2022), Australian politician
- Margaret Dayton (born 1949), American politician
- Margaret Delacourt-Smith, Baroness Delacourt-Smith of Alteryn (1916–2010), British Labour politician
- Margaret Delisle (born 1946), Canadian politician
- Margaret Dennison (1920–2010), American politician
- Margaret H. Dickson (born 1949), American politician from North Carolina
- Margaret Doherty, American politician
- Margaret Dongo, Zimbabwean politician
- Margaret Doud (born 1943), American politician
- Margaret Drye, American politician
- Margaret E. Dungan (1884–1982), American Quaker suffrage, peace and hunger activist
- Margaret Dunkle (born 1947), American activist who created Title IX
- Margaret Dyer-Howe (1941–2019), Montserratian politician and businesswoman
- Margaret Eaton, Baroness Eaton (born 1942), British Conservative politician
- Margaret Ekpo (1914–2006), Nigerian women's rights activist and social mobilizer
- Margaret Ekua Prah, Ghanaian diplomat
- Margaret Evans, New Zealand mayor
- Margaret Everson, acting director of the U. S. National Park Service
- Margaret Ewing (1945–2006), Scottish politician
- Margaret Farquhar (1930–2026), Scottish political pioneer
- Margaret Milne Farquharson (1884–after 1936), Scottish suffragette and MP candidate
- Margaret Farrow (1934–2022), American politician
- Margrith von Felten (born 1944), Swiss politician
- Margaret Ferrier (born 1960), British Member of Parliament for Rutherglen and Hamilton West
- Margaret Fitzherbert (born 1969), Australian politician
- Margaret Flory (born 1948), American politician
- Margaret Foley (1873–1957), Irish-American labor organizer, suffragist, and social worker
- Margaret French McLean (1879–1959), First Lady of North Carolina
- Margaret Gardner Hoey (1875–1942), American political hostess and First Lady of North Carolina
- Margaret H. George (1928–2021), American politician
- Margaret Skirving Gibb (1877–1954), Scottish suffragette
- Margaret Gibb (1892–1984), English political activist
- Margaret V. Gillespie (born 1969), American politician
- Margaret Good (born 1976), American politician
- Margaret Greenwood (born 1959), British Member of Parliament for Wirral West
- Margaret Guilfoyle (1926–2020), Australian politician
- Margaret Gunn (1889–1989), Canadian activist
- Margaret Hance (1923–1990), American politician
- Margaret Harrington (born 1945), Canadian politician
- Margarett (Maggie) Hassan (born 1958), United States Senator for New Hampshire
- Margaret Hawkins (1877–1969), African-American activist
- Margaret Heckler (1931–2018), American politician
- Margaret Heneghan, Irish barrister and judge
- Margaret Rose Henry (born 1944), American politician
- Margaret Hewitt, British suffragette
- Margaret Hill (1885–1970), British social reformer
- Margaret E. Hillestad (born 1961), Norwegian politician
- Margaret Hills, British politician, suffragist, feminist and teacher
- Margaret Hobbs (1909–1997), Canadian politician and educator
- Margaret Hodge (born 1944), British Member of Parliament for Barking
- Margaret Holmes (1909–2009), Australian peace activist
- Margaret Hoover (born 1977), American political consultant and commentator, great-granddaughter of the former president
- Margaret Leslie Hore-Ruthven (1901–1970), British socialite
- Margaret Lea Houston (1819–1867), First Lady of the Republic of Texas
- Margaret Huang, American human rights advocate
- Margaret Hughes, American politician
- Margaret Humphreys (born 1944), British social worker and author
- Margaret Hunter (jurist), Australian jurist
- Margaret Hunter (1922–1986), Scottish communist activist and trade unionist
- Margaret Hurley (Connecticut politician) (1878–1975), American politician from Connecticut
- Margaret Hurley (Washington politician) (1909–2015), American politician from Washington
- Margaret Irwin (1858–1940), Scottish women's labor activist
- Margaret J. Jackson (died 2003), American politician
- Margaret Jackson (1917–2013), British government secretary
- Margaret Jamieson (born 1953), Scottish politician
- Margaret Jay, Baroness Jay of Paddington (born 1939), British baroness
- Margaret Jobson (born 1955), Jamaican diplomat
- Margaret Johnson, Canadian politician
- Margaret (Maggie) Jones, Baroness Jones of Whitchurch, British Labour Peer and trade union official
- Margaret Kaiser, American politician
- Margaret Kamar (born 1959), Kenyan politician
- Margaret Keech (born 1954), Australian politician
- Margaret Keita, Gambian politician
- Margaret Kelly, American civil servant
- Margaret B. Kelly (born 1935), American politician
- Margaret Rose Kelsick, Montserratian politician
- Margaret Kennedy, American politician
- Margaret L. Kennedy (1892–1953), Irish politician
- Margaret Kenyatta (mayor) (1928–2017), Kenyan politician
- Margaret Kenyatta (born 1964), former first lady of Kenya (2013–2022)
- Margaret G. Kibben (born 1960), American chaplain
- Margaret D. Klein, United States Navy admiral
- Margaret Kobia (born 1955), Kenyan civil servant
- Margaret Komuhangi (born 1970), Ugandan politician
- Margaret Konantz (1899–1967), Canadian politician
- Margaret Kouvelis, New Zealand politician
- Margaret B. Laird (1871–1968), American politician
- Margaret Currie Neilson Lamb (1907–1992), Scottish nurse and Council Chair
- Margaret Lamwaka Odwar (born 1969), Ugandan politician
- Margaret Laurino (born 1952), American politician
- Margaret Legum (1933–2007), South African anti-apartheid activist and social reformer
- Margaret Burr Leonard (1942–2022), American civil rights activist and journalist
- Margaret S. Lewis (born 1954), American politician
- Margaret Lloyd George (1864–1941), Welsh humanitarian
- Margaret Long (born 1938), American politician
- Margaret Lord (born 1948), Canadian politician
- Margaret Bright Lucas (1818–1890), British suffragist and reformer
- Margaret Ludwig (1933–2017), American politician
- Margaret MacDiarmid, Canadian politician
- Margaret MacDonald (born 1951), American politician
- Margaret Macfarlane, Scottish suffragette in Dundee
- Margaret A. Mahoney (1893–1981), American politician
- Margaret Markey (born 1941), American politician
- Margaret Marland (born 1934), Canadian politician
- Margaret Selina Martei, Ghanaian Member of Parliament for Asamankese (1965–1966)
- Margaret E. Morton (1924–2012), American politician
- Margaret May (born 1950), Australian politician
- Margaret Mbeiza Kisira (born 1973), Ugandan politician
- Margaret McAleer (1930–1999), Australian politician
- Margaret McCain (born 1934), 27th lieutenant governor of New Brunswick
- Margaret McCulloch (born 1952), Scottish labor politician
- Margaret McDonagh, Baroness McDonagh (1961–2023), British politician
- Margaret McFadden (1870–1932), American community leader
- Margaret McGovern (1924–2009), American politician
- Margaret McIntyre (1886–1948), Australian politician
- Margaret McKenzie, former High Sheriff of Belfast
- Margaret McLean (1845–1923), Australian suffragist
- Margaret McPhun (1876–1960), Scottish suffragette
- Margaret Meagher (1911–1999), Canadian diplomat
- Margaret Sara Meggitt (1866–1920), British political activist and suffragette
- Margaret Mensah-Williams (born 1961), Namibian diplomat
- Margaret Millard, New Zealand rural community leader
- Margaret Miller, Canadian politician
- Margaret Mitchell (Canadian politician) (1925–2017), New Democratic Party Member of Parliament for Vancouver East
- Margaret Mitchell (Scottish politician) (born 1952), Scottish Conservative politician
- Margaret Ghogha Molomo, South African environmental activist
- Margaret Moran (born 1955), former Labour MP for Luton South who was convicted of the largest amount of fraud in the United Kingdom parliamentary expenses scandal
- Margaret Mullane, British politician
- Margaret "Peggy" Murphy (1930–2016), American politician
- Margaret Murphy O'Mahony (born 1969), Irish politician
- Margaret Mylne (1806–1892), Scottish suffragette and writer
- Margaret D. Nadauld (born 1944), American church leader
- Margaret Nakashuk, Canadian politician
- Margaret Nakikus, Papua New Guinean government planner
- Margaret Neckles, Grenadian politician
- Margaret Nevinson (1858–1932), English suffragist
- Margaret Norrie (1905–1983), Canadian politician
- Margaret Nosek (1952–2020), American activist
- Margaret Nyagahura, Rwandan politician
- Margaret O'Brien (born 1973), American politician
- Margaret O'Connor Wilson (1856–1942), American civic leader
- Margaret Ocran, Ghanaian politician
- Margaret Ogg (1863–1953), Australian feminist advocate
- Margaret O'Neil, American politician
- Margaret O'Riordan, American politician
- Margaret Pageler (born 1940), American politician
- Margaret Mary Pearse (1878–1968), Irish politician
- Margaret Pearse (1857–1932), Irish politician
- Margaret B. Peeke (1838–1908), American traveler, lecturer, author and Martinist leader
- Margaret L. Plunkett (1906–2000), American diplomat
- Margaret Porter, American politician
- Margaret Prescod, Barbadian activist, author and journalist
- Margaret Prosser, Baroness Prosser (born 1937), British politician
- Margaret Pyke (1893–1966), British activist
- Margaret Quirk (born 1957), Australian politician
- Margaret Rajbally (born 1932), South African politician and trade unionist
- Margaret Ransone (born 1973), American politician
- Margaret Ray (1933–2017), Australian politician
- Margaret Rayburn (1927–2013), American politician
- Margaret Reid (born 1935), Australian politician
- Margaret Renwick (1920–2012), Canadian politician
- Margaret Reynolds (born 1941), Australian politician
- Margaret Rideout (1923–2010), Canadian politician
- Margaret Ritchie (born 1958), politician who served in the Northern Ireland Assembly and both British Houses of Parliament
- Margaret Rogers (born 1949), American politician
- Margaret Rothwell (1938–2022), British diplomat
- Margaret Rowe (1949–2022), Australian politician
- Margaret Ruhl (born 1956), American politician
- Margaret Rwabushaija (born 1956), Ugandan politician
- Margaret Rwebyambu, Ugandan politician and legislator
- Margaret Rose Sanford (1918–2006), First Lady of North Carolina
- Margaret Scarsdale, American politician
- Margaret Schweinhaut (1903–1997), American politician
- Margaret Scobey, American diplomat
- Margaret Scrivener (1922–1997), Canadian politician
- Margaret Semple (1876–1967), New Zealand politician and socialist
- Margaret Shields (1941–2013), New Zealand politician
- Margaret Shonekan (born 1941), First Lady of Nigeria
- Margaret Sievwright (1844–1905), New Zealand feminist, political activist and community leader
- Margaret Simwanza Sitta (born 1946), Tanzanian politician
- Margaret Sitte, American politician
- Margaret Skok, Canadian diplomat
- Margaret Sloan-Hunter (1947–2004), American feminist
- Margaret Smith (Illinois politician) (died 2005), American politician
- Margaret Smith (Scottish politician) (born 1961), Scottish politician
- Margaret Smith (West Virginia politician), American politician
- Margaret Snyder (1940–2010), American politician
- Margaret Jane Spear, American politician
- Margaret Anne Staggers (1945–2026), American politician
- Margaret Jane Steele Rozsa (1867–1949), American politician
- Margaret Stock, American politician
- Margaret Strachan, American politician
- Margaret Strekas (died 1987), American politician
- Margaret Strelow, Australian politician
- Margaret Rockefeller Strong (1897–1985), American activist
- Margaret Sullivan (born 1962), American chief of staff
- Margaret Sutton, American politician
- Margaret Tanner (1817–c. 1905), English social reformer
- Margaret Tartaglione (1933–2019), Philadelphia politician
- Margaret Tate (died 2006), American politician
- Margaret Taylor (1788–1852), First Lady of the U. S. (1849–1850)
- Margaret Thatcher (1925–2013), first female prime minister of the United Kingdom who served from 1979 to 1990
- Margaret Thom, Canadian politician
- Marguerite Thomas-Clement (1886–1979), Luxembourger politician
- Margaret Thorp (1892–1978), Australian welfare worker
- Margeret (Maggie) Throup (born 1967), British Member of Parliament for Erewash
- Margaret Joy Tibbetts (1919–2010), American diplomat
- Margaret Tor-Thompson (1962–2007), Liberian politician
- Margaret Torrie (1912–1999), British social worker and charity founder
- Margaret Travers Symons, British suffragette
- Margaret Trowe (born 1948), American politician and women's rights activist
- Margaret Tucker (1904–1996), Australian Aboriginal activist and writer
- Margaret D. Tutwiler (born 1950), American politician
- Margaret Twomey (born 1963), Australian diplomat
- Margaret Tynan (1930–2007), Irish politician
- Margaret Utinsky (1900–1970), American humanitarian
- Margaret A. Uyehara, American diplomat
- Margaret Vanderhye (born 1948), American politician
- Margaret P. Varda (1917–2011), American politician
- Margaret Vogt (1950–2014), Nigerian diplomat
- Margaret Wall, Baroness Wall of New Barnet (1941–2017), British trade unionist
- Margaret Wanjiru, Kenyan politician
- Margaret Waring (1887–1968), politician from Northern Ireland
- Margaret Weichert, American government executive
- Margaret Weissinger Castleman (c. 1880–1945), American suffragist and campaigner
- Margaret Wheeler, Baroness Wheeler (born 1949), British life peer
- Margaret Whitlam (1919–2012), Australian social campaigner and athlete
- Margaret Fay Whittemore (1884–1937), American suffragist
- Margaret Ray Wickens (1843–1918), American public affairs organizer, social reformer, and charitable organization leader
- Margaret Bush Wilson (1919–2009), American activist
- Margaret Wilson (born 1947), New Zealand politician
- Margaret Wingfield (1912–2002), British Liberal Party politician
- Margaret Wintringham (1879–1955), British politician
- Margaret Wirrpanda (c. 1939–2013), Australian Aboriginal activist in Victoria
- Margaret Woodgate (born 1935), Australian politician
- Margaret Woodrow Wilson (1886–1944), First Lady of the United States (1914–15)
- Margaret Wright (1921–1996), American politician
- Margaret Zziwa, Ugandan politician

== Sports ==
- Margaret Abbott (1878–1955), American golfer
- Margaret Adeoye (born 1985), British sprinter
- Margaret Aka, Papua New Guinean soccer player and coach
- Margaret Akidor (born 2002), Kenyan runner
- Margaret Austen, English diver
- Margaret Auton (born 1951), British swimmer
- Margaret Bamgbose (born 1993), Nigerian track and field sprinter
- Margaret Barrand, English badminton player
- Margaret Beacham (born 1946), British middle-distance runner
- Margaret Bean (born 1953), Guamian cyclist
- Margaret Beck (1952–2023), English badminton player
- Margaret Belemu (born 1997), Zambian footballer
- Margaret Bell (athlete) (1917–1996), Canadian high jumper
- Margaret Bell (gymnast) (1945–2024), British gymnast
- Margaret Bennett (1910–1984), American figure skater
- Margaret Bertasi (born 1992), American rower
- Margaret Birtwistle (1925–1992), British discus thrower and shot putter
- Margaret Bisbrown (1919–2009), British diver
- Margaret Varner Bloss (born 1927), American athlete and professor
- Margaret Bourke (1945–2021), Australian bridge player
- Margaret Boxall, English badminton player
- Margaret Boyd (1913–1993), English lacrosse player and schoolteacher
- Margaret Buck (born 1940), Australian canoeist
- Margaret Burvill (1941–2009), Australian sprinter
- Margaret Caldow (born 1941), Australian netball international and coach
- Margaret Callender (born 1939), English javelin thrower
- Margaret Castro (born 1959), American judoka and trainer
- Margaret Coomber (born 1950), British middle-distance runner
- Margaret Court (born 1942), Australian tennis player
- Margaret Cremen (born 1999), Irish rower
- Margaret Critchley (born 1949), British sprinter
- Margaret Crosland (1939–2024), Canadian figure skater
- Margaret Crowley (born 1986), American speed skater
- Margaret Curtis (1883–1965), American tennis player and golfer
- Margaret Danhauser (1921–1987), American baseball player
- Margaret Darvall (1909–1996), British mountaineer
- Margaret Dingeldein (born 1980), American water polo player
- Margaret Donahue (1892–1978), American baseball executive
- Margaret Edwards (born 1939), English swimmer
- Margaret Erskine (1925–2006), British long jumper
- Margaret Etim (born 1992), Nigerian sprinter
- Margaret Fettes, Canadian international lawn bowls player
- Margaret Filippini (1946–2003), New Zealand netball player
- Margaret Swan Forbes (1919–2010), American swimmer
- Margaret Forsyth (1961–2021), New Zealand netball player and coach
- Margaret Foster, New Zealand netball player and coach
- Margaret Franks, British table tennis player
- Margaret Gast (1876–1968), German-born American racing cyclist
- Margaret Gayen (born 1994), Australian long jumper and sprinter
- Margaret Gibson (rower) (born 1961), Zimbabwean Olympic rower
- Margaret Gibson (swimmer) (born 1938), Australian swimmer
- Margaret Girvan (1932–1979), Scottish swimmer
- Margaret Gisolo (1914–2009), baseball player
- Margaret Gleghorne, Great Britain and Ireland women's hockey player
- Margaret Gomm (1921–1974), British swimmer
- Margaret Grant, Irish boccia player
- Margaret Groos (born 1959), American long-distance runner
- Margaret Grundy (born 1938), English swimmer
- Margaret Halliday (born 1956), New Zealand-born Australian motorsport racer
- Margaret Harding (born 1948), Puerto Rican swimmer
- Margaret Harriman (1928–2003), South African Paralympic athlete
- Margaret Hedeman (born 2000), American rower
- Margaret Hellyer (born 1937), Australian tennis player
- Margaret Hemsley (born 1971), Australian cyclist
- Margaret Hoelzer (born 1983), American swimmer
- Margaret Hoffman (1911–1991), American swimmer
- Margaret Holgerson (1927–1990), American baseball player
- Margaret Howe (squash player) (1897–1989), American squash player
- Margaret Howe (athlete) (born 1958), Canadian sprinter
- Margaret Hughes (1919–2005), English sportswriter
- Margaret Hunt (born 1942), South African tennis player
- Margaret Indakala (born 1962), Kenyan volleyball player
- Margaret Iwasaki (born 1942), Canadian swimmer
- Margaret Jackson (1843–1906), English mountain climber
- Margaret Jeffery (1920–2004), British swimmer and Olympian
- Margaret Jenkins (1903–1996), American discus thrower
- Margaret Jennings (born 1949), Australian cricketer
- Margaret Jessee (1921–2007), American tennis player and a Napa Valley vintner
- Margaret de Jesús (born 1957), Puerto Rican sprinter
- Margaret Johnson (1937–2015), Australian long jumper
- Margaret Johnston (born 1943), Northern Irish bowler
- Margaret Jude (born 1940), Australian cricketer
- Margaret Jurgensmeier (1934–2020), American baseball player
- Margaret Kelly (born 1956), English swimmer
- Margaret Kipkemboi (born 1993), Kenyan long-distance runner
- Margaret Knickle, Canadian curler
- Margaret Knighton (born 1955), New Zealand equestrian
- Margaret Langford (born 1970), Canadian slalom canoeist
- Margaret Lennan, Scottish female snooker and billiards player
- Margaret Letham (born 1956), British lawn bowler
- Margaret Lockwood (bowls) (1927–2020), English international lawn bowler
- Margaret Lockwood (cricketer) (1911–1999), English cricketer
- Margaret Lu (born 1994), American fencer
- Margaret Macchiut (born 1974), Italian hurdler
- Margaret Macrae, New Zealand swimmer
- Margaret Marks (1918–2014), New Zealand cricketer
- Margaret Markvardt (born 2000), Estonian swimmer
- Margaret Martin (born 1979), American professional bodybuilder
- Margaret Matangi (1911–1990), New Zealand netball player
- Margaret Matthews (born 1935), American track and field athlete
- Margaret Maughan (1928–2020), British Paralympic archer
- Margaret Maury (born 1974), French long-distance runner
- Margaret McIver (1933–2020), Australian equestrian
- Margaret McKenzie (born 1970), New Zealand rugby union player
- Margaret Mills, Zimbabwean international lawn bowler
- Margaret Molesworth (1894–1985), Australian tennis player
- Margaret Moore (1861–1940), English tennis player
- Margaret Morphew (1916–1987), South African tennis player
- Margaret Morton (born 1968), Scottish curler
- Margaret Mukoya (born 1973), Kenyan volleyball player
- Margaret Murdock (born 1942), American sports shooter
- Margaret Muriuki (born 1986), Kenyan runner
- Margaret Murphy (Olympian) (born 1944), Irish hurdler
- Margaret Murphy (Paralympian), Australian Paralympic athlete
- Margaret Murray (1948–2006), American baseball player
- Margaret Nankabirwa (born 1987), Ugandan badminton player
- Margaret Ngoche (born 1981), Kenyan cricketer
- Margaret Ngotho (born 1970), Kenyan long-distance runner
- Margaret Northrop (born 1934), Kenyan swimmer
- Margaret H. O'Donnell, Australian tennis player
- Margaret R. O'Donnell, British tennis player
- Margaret Okayo (born 1976), Kenyan marathon runner
- Margaret O'Leary, Irish camogie player and trainer
- Margaret Osborne (1913–c. 1987), British table tennis player
- Margaret Owens (1922–1955), American barrel racer
- Margaret "Polly" Palfrey Woodrow (1906–1997), American tennis player
- Margaret Parker (archer), British athlete
- Margaret Parker (javelin thrower) (born 1949), Australian athlete
- Margaret Pawson (1940–1997), New Zealand netball player
- Margaret Peden (1905–1981), Australian cricketer
- Margaret Peear (born 1955), English cricketer
- Margaret Pomeroy, British lawn bowler
- Margaret Osborne duPont (1918–2012), American table tennis player
- Margaret Purce (born 1995) American soccer player
- Margaret Purdy (born 1995), Canadian pair skater
- Margaret Ramsbotham, Papua New Guinean international lawn bowler
- Margaret Ravoir (1907–1973), American swimmer
- Margaret Richardson, Scottish curler and coach
- Margaret Robb (born 1942), Canadian speed skater
- Margaret Rodriguez (born 1977), American retired soccer player
- Margaret Roney (1899–1983), British Olympic sailor
- Margaret Ross, Australian Paralympic archer
- Margaret Russo (1931–2006), baseball player
- Margaret Rutherford (born 1935), English cricketer
- Margaret Satupai (born 1992), Samoan athlete
- Margaret Saurin (born 1978), Irish association footballer and coach
- Margaret Scriven (1912–2001), British tennis player
- Margaret Simpson (born 1981), Ghanaian heptathlete
- Margaret Stafford (born 1931), British fencer
- Margaret Stefani (1917–1964), American baseball player
- Margaret Stocks (1895–1985), English badminton and tennis player
- Margaret Stone (1919–2001), Canadian swimmer
- Margaret Storrar (born 1971), American field hockey player
- Margaret Stride (born 1954), Canadian sprinter
- Margaret Stuart (1934–1999), New Zealand sprinter
- Margaret Sumner (1941–2022), Australian lawn bowls player
- Margaret Sweeney, New Zealand swimmer
- Margaret Thomas, British sport shooter
- Margaret Todd (1918–2019), Canadian golfer
- Margaret Tollerton (born 1958), Irish equestrian
- Margaret Toscano (born 1956), Indian field hockey player
- Margaret Tosh (born 1937), Canadian javelin thrower
- Margaret Tragett (1885–1964), English badminton player
- Margaret Tumusiime (born 1962), Ugandan archer
- Margaret Wade (1912–1995), American college basketball player and coach
- Margaret Wagar (1902–1990), American bridge player
- Margaret Walker (1925–2016), British athlete
- Margaret Wambui (born 1995), Kenyan middle distance runner
- Margaret Watson (born 1986), Australian rugby union player
- Margaret Weedon (1853–1930), British archer
- Margaret Wellington (1926–2015), British swimmer
- Margaret Wenzell (1925–2014), baseball player
- Margaret White Wrixon (born 1944), British swimmer
- Margaret Wigiser (1924–2019), American baseball player
- Margaret Wilks (born 1950), English cricketer
- Margaret Wilson (tennis), Australian tennis player
- Margaret Wilson (cricketer) (born 1946), Australian cricketer
- Margaret Wiseman, Scottish curler
- Margaret Woodbridge (1902–1995), American swimmer
- Margaret Woodlock (born 1938), Australian shot putter
- Margaret Zachariah, Australian squash player

== Other ==
- Margaret Q. Adams (1874–1974), American law enforcement officer
- Margaret Adams, Australian aviator
- Margaret Agee, New Zealand mental health researcher
- Margaret Aitken (1906–1980), Canadian author, columnist, journalist, and politician
- Margaret Alcorn (1868–1967), New Zealand interior decorator
- Margaret Irene Anderson (1915–1995), Australian Army nurse
- Margaret Jean Anderson (1915–2003), Canadian businesswoman and politician
- Margaret Anderson (1834–1910), Scottish museum founder
- Margaret J. Anderson, American hotel owner, businesswoman and socialite
- Margaret Anderson Watts (1832–1905), American social reformer, writer and clubwoman
- Margaret Ansei, Ghanaian business executive and politician
- Margaret Anstee (1926–2016), British diplomat and writer
- Margaret Arlen (1916–2000), American talk show host
- Margaret Arnstein (1904–1972), American nurse and public health researcher
- Margaret E. Bailey (1915–2014), African-American nurse
- Margaret H. Bair, U. S. Air Force general
- Margaret Ida Balfour (1866–1945), Scottish doctor and campaigner
- Margaret Barbour, British businesswoman and philanthropist
- Margaret Barclay, died 1618 as a result of witch trials held in Irvine, Ayrshire
- Margaret Bartlett Thornton (1901–1981), American woman pilot and poet
- Margaret Bartley (born 1959), American judge
- Margaret Battye (1909–1949), Australian lawyer
- Margaret Beavan (1875–1931), English welfare worker and local politician
- Margaret Bechstein Hays (1887–1956), American survivor of the titanic sinking
- Margaret Bedggood (born 1939), New Zealand professor at University of Waikato and Chief Human Rights Commissioner
- Margaret Benn, Viscountess Stansgate (1897–1991), British theologian and advocate of women's rights
- Margaret Olofsson Bergman (1872–1948), American weaver, teacher and designer
- Margaret Binley, British silversmith
- Margaret Bird, American economist and activist
- Margaret Blackshere (died 2019), American labor organizer and leader
- Margaret Catherine Blaikie (1823–1915), Scottish temperance reformer
- Margaret Blatch (1886–1963), English vegetarian chef, restaurateur, and cookbook writer
- Margaret Bonga Fahlstrom (c. 1797–1880), mixed-race woman of African and Ojibwe descent
- Margaret Booth (1933–2021), British judge
- Margaret Borland (1824–1873), American pioneer
- Margaret Braun, American baker
- Margaret Brayne, 16th century London theatre owner
- Margaret Brent (c. 1601–1671), English immigrant colonial landowner
- Margaret A. Brewer (1930–2013), United States Marine Corps general
- Margaret Brooke (1915–2016), nursing sister of the Royal Caribbean Navy
- Margaret Brown (1867–1932), survivor of the sinking of the Titanic
- Margaret Brownlow (1916–1968), English gardener and writer
- Margaret Bullock (1845–1903), New Zealand writer and feminist
- Margaret W. Burcham, brigadier general of the United States Army
- Margaret Burges, Scottish woman executed for witchcraft
- Margaret Burnham Geddes (1907–1995), American architect
- Margaret Burnham (born 1944), American lawyer and academic
- Margaret Burns, Edinburgh prostitute
- Margaret Bushby Lascelles Cockburn (1829–1928), British-Indian ornithologist and artist
- Margaret Just Butcher (1913–2000), American educator and civil rights activist
- Margaret Menzies Campbell (1893–1990), Scottish surgeon
- Margaret Anne Cargill (1920–2006), American philanthropist
- Margaret Caro (1848–1938), New Zealand dentist and social reformer
- Margaret Casely-Hayford (born 1959), British lawyer
- Margaret Casson (1913–1999), British architect
- Margaret Center Klingelsmith (1852–1931), American suffragist, lawyer, translator, and law librarian
- Margaret Chabot, American hotel owner
- Margaret Bailey Chandler (1929–1997), American community leader
- Margaret Chanler Aldrich (1870–1963), American nurse and author
- Margaret Chiara (born 1943), American lawyer
- Margaret Chutich (born 1958), American judge
- Margaret Clap, English innkeeper
- Margaret Turner Clarke, Australian nurse
- Margaret G. Cobb (1907–2010), American musicologist and archivist
- Margaret Cochran Corbin (1751–1800), fought in the U.S. Revolutionary War and was given a pension by Congress
- Margaret Cole (1893–1980), English politician and poet
- Margaret Collier (1719–1794), English companion and correspondent
- Margaret Cooper (nurse) (1922–2013), English nurse
- Margaret Cooper (WRNS officer) (1918–2016), member of the Women's Royal Naval Service
- Margaret Isobel Cooper (1915–2015), British naval auxiliary officer
- Margaret Corbin (1751–1800), American combatant in the American Revolutionary War
- Margaret Cowie Crowe (1882–1973), Scottish nurse who served in Serbia and Russia during World War I
- Margaret Crang (1910–1992), Canadian lawyer, teacher, journalist and activist
- Margaret Crawford, urban planner and professor
- Margaret Cunneen (born 1959), Australian barrister, prosecutor and commissioner
- Margaret Cunnison (1914–2004), Scottish aviator and flying instructor
- Margaret E. Curran, American lawyer
- Margaret Cuyler (1758–1814), actress and courtesan
- Margaret Llewelyn Davies (1861–1944), general secretary of the Cooperative Women's Guild
- Margaret Damer Dawson (1873–1920), English animal rights activist, anti-vivisectionist and philanthropist
- Margaret De Patta (1903–1964), American jewelry designer and educator
- Margaret Dilke (1857–1914), British writer and campaigner for women's rights
- Margaret Dobbs (1871–1962), Irish scholar and playwright
- Margaret Dockrell (1849–1926), Irish suffragist, philanthropist and councillor
- Margaret Elizabeth Douglas (1934–2008), English television producer and executive
- Margaret Douie Dougal (1858–1938), British chemical publication indexer
- Margaret Dunning (1910–2015), American businesswoman
- Margaret Dye Ellis (1845–1925), American social reformer
- Margaret Fairchild (1911–1989), British homeless woman
- Margaret Fairley (1885–1968), Canadian educator, writer and political activist
- Margaret Fairweather (1901–1944), British aviator
- Margaret Feeny (1917–2012), founder and first director of London's Africa Centre
- Margaret Feilman (1921–2013), Australian architect, landscape designer and town planner
- Margaret Findlay (1916–2007), Australian architect
- Margaret Flagg Holmes (1886–1976), Alpha Kappa Alpha founder
- Margaret Forbes (c. 1807–1877), New Zealand innkeeper and land protestor
- Margaret Hadley Foster (1843–1920), American journalist, clubwoman and librarian
- Margaret Marjory Fraser (1885–1918), Canadian military nurse
- Margaret Frere (1863–1961), British school manager and welfare worker
- Margaret Fritsch (1899–1993), American architect
- Margaret Furse (1911–1974), British costume designer
- Margaret Gaj (1919–2011), restaurant owner and political activist
- Margaret Gardiner (born 1959), South African journalist, beauty queen and Miss Universe
- Margaret Garner, U. S. fugitive slave
- Margaret Garnett (born 1971), American judge
- Margaret Gatty (1809–1873), British writer and botanist
- Margaret Getchell (1841–1880), American retail executive
- Margaret Gorman (1905–1995), American model and beauty queen
- Margaret Manson Graham (1860–1933), Scottish nurse and missionary
- Margaret Graham (matron) (1860–1942), Australian nursing sister and army matron
- Margaret Graham (balloonist), British aeronaut
- Margaret Greenall, English businesswoman
- Margaret Grubb (1907–1963), American aviator
- Margaret R. Guzman (born 1960), American judge
- Margaret Hamilton Brown (1858–1952), Scottish-born school founder and headmistress
- Margaret Hamilton Reid (1912–2010), Irish businesswoman
- Margaret Hampshire (1918–2004), British educator and civil servant
- Margaret Hanmer (c. 1362 – c. 1420), the wife of Welsh leader Owain Glyndŵr
- Margaret Harkett, English woman executed for witchcraft
- Margaret Harris Amsler (1908–2002), American lawyer and law professor
- Margaret Harris (1904–2000), English theatre costume designer
- Margaret Harrison (born 1940), British feminist and artist
- Margaret Havinden (1895–1974), Scottish advertising executive
- Margaret Jane Scott Hawthorne (1869–1958), New Zealand tailor, trade unionist and factory inspector
- Margaret Hebblethwaite (born 1951), British writer, journalist, activist and religious worker
- Margaret Heffernan (Irish businesswoman) (born 1942), Irish businesswoman and CEO of retailer Dunnes Stores
- Margaret Heffernan (born 1955), American entrepreneur, CEO, writer and keynote speaker
- Margaret Heitkemper, American nurse
- Margaret Heitland (1860–1938), British journalist and suffragist
- Margaret Helfand (1947–2007), American architect and urban planner
- Margaret Heng (born 1961), Singaporean businesswomen
- Margaret Hicks, American architect
- Margaret Hicks Williams (1899-1972), American government official, writer, political expert
- Margaret Hitchcock (1883–1967), New Zealand nurse
- Margaret Hockaday (1907–1992), American advertising executive
- Margaret Emily Hodge (1858–1938), British educator and suffragist
- Margaret Holmes, Australian community worker and refugee resettlement officer
- Margaret Howell (born 1946), British fashion designer
- Margaret Hutton, early settler colonist in southwestern Pennsylvania and the largest enslaver in the state at the time of the first federal census
- Margaret Huxley (1854–1940), English nurse
- Margaret Hyndman (1901–1991), Canadian lawyer
- Margaret Illukol (1954?–2015), Ugandan nurse known for surviving a disfiguring hyena attack as a girl
- Margaret Inequane, Manx woman who was executed for witchcraft
- Margaret Ireri, Kenyan businesswoman and market research professional
- Margaret Irvine (1948–2023), British crossword compiler
- Margaret Isely (1921–1997), American businesswoman
- Margaret Jackson (born 1953), Australian corporate executive
- Margaret Jarvie (1928–2004), Scottish swimmer and counselor
- Margaret Jeffrey (1896–1977), Australian police officer
- Margaret Johnstone (1851–1909), English missionary and educator in Hong Kong
- Margaret Josephs (born 1967), American fashion designer, entrepreneur and television personality
- Margaret M. Keane, American businesswoman
- Margaret Kempe Howell (1806–1867), American planter and slave owner
- Margaret Kidd (1900–1989), Scottish legal advocate, editor and politician
- Margaret Kirchner Stevenson (1920–1998), American pilot and educator
- Margaret K. Knight (1903–1983), British psychologist, secular humanist advocate and radio presenter
- Margaret E. Kuhn (1905–1995), founder of the Gray Panthers organisation
- Margaret Rebecca Lahee (1831–1895), Irish popular Lancashire dialect writer
- Margaret Lambert (1906–1995), British historian and art collector
- Margaret Lang (1893–1983), Australian nurse
- Margaret Leonard (1916–2004), American tax consultant and politician from Washington
- Margaret Livingston (1895–1984), American actress and businesswoman
- Margaret Loesch, American television producer and executive
- Margaret Looker (1910–1988), Australian hospital matron and nurse
- Margaret Lorimer (1866–1954), New Zealand school principal and mountaineer
- Margaret Louden (1910–1998), British surgeon
- Margaret Anne Lyons, Australian nurse activist
- Margaret MacDonald (1873–1948), Canadian military nurse
- Margaret MacKay, New Zealand lawyer
- Margaret Hope MacPherson (1908–2001), Scottish crofter, politician, author and activist
- Margaret Magill (1888–1962), New Zealand educator and politician
- Margaret H. Marshall (born 1944), American judge
- Margaret Maxfield (1926–2016), American mathematician and textbook author
- Margaret M. McChesney, American lawyer
- Margaret McCurry (born 1942), American architect
- Margaret Bischell McFadden, American philanthropist and social worker
- Margaret McKay (1907–1996), British trade unionist and politician
- Margaret McKelvy Bird (1909–1996), American socialite and archaeologist
- Margaret McMurdo (born 1954), Australian judge
- Margaret McMurray, the last native speakers of a Lowland dialect of Scottish Gaelic in the Galloway variety
- Margaret McNaughton, Scottish Canadian author and historian
- Margaret Mercer (1791–1846), American abolitionist and educator
- Margaret Stevenson Miller (1896–1979), British campaigner for women's rights and lecturer
- Margaret Mitchell (chief executive), American lawyer and CEO
- Margaret Mittelheuser, Australian stockbroker
- Margaret Molloy, Irish businesswoman
- Margaret Ann Moore (born 1957), Canadian-American executive coach
- Margaret Pitt Morison (1900–1985), Australian architect
- Margaret M. Morrow (born 1950), American judge
- Margaret Mountford (born 1951), British lawyer, businessman and television personality
- Margaret A. Muir, 19th-century American schooner
- Margaret Munro (1914–2005), New Zealand architect
- Margaret Stuyvesant Murat (1891–1976), American heiress, dancer and actress
- Margaret Mwanakatwe (born 1961), Zambian accountant, bank executive and politician
- Margaret Naylor (1893–1967), British woman who became first female deep-sea diver
- Margaret Neill Fraser (1880–1915), First World War heroine and amateur golfer
- Margaret Ann Neve (1792–1903), Guernesey supercentenarian
- Margaret de Neville, English landowner
- Margaret Cross Norton (1891–1984), First Illinois State Archivist
- Margaret Nyakang'o, Kenyan accountant
- Margaret Nyland (born 1942), Australian writer
- Margaret Obi, British judge
- Margaret Oliver (born 1955), English detective constable and whistleblower
- Margaret O'Rourke, Australian politician and academic administrator
- Margaret Penny (1812–1861), Scottish woman explorer
- Margaret Peterlin (born 1970), American lawyer and government official
- Margaret Phelan (1902–2000), president of the Kilkenny Archaeological Society
- Margaret Pilkington (1906–1985), English Girl Guide leader
- Margaret Montgomery Pirrie (1857–1935), Irish public figure and philanthropist
- Margaret Poisal, Arapaho interpreter
- Margaret Pope (1918–?), British journalist and anti-colonial activist
- Margaret Prior (1773–1842), American humanitarian, missionary, moral reform worker, writer
- Margaret Puxon (1915–2008), English gynecologist, obstetrician and barrister
- Margaret Quass (1926–2003), British educationalist and activist
- Margaret Ramsay-Hale, Jamaican lawyer and judge
- Margaret Ratner Kunstler, civil rights attorney
- Margaret Mary Ray (1952–1998), American stalker
- Margaret Raymond, American lawyer
- Margaret Read (architect), American architect
- Margaret Richards (1928–2022), Scottish architect
- Margaret Richardson (1943–2021), American lawyer
- Margaret Ringenberg (1921–2008), American aviator
- Margaret M. Risk, Canadian nurse
- Margaret Zattau Roan (1905–1975), American music therapist
- Margaret S. Roberts (1872–1952), American librarian and suffragist
- Margaret Roberts (1937–2017), South African herbalist
- Margaret Dreier Robins (1868–1945), American labor leader and philanthropist
- Margaret Robinson (activist and scholar), Canadian activist
- Margaret Hayden Rorke (1883–1969), American color standards expert, actress and suffragist
- Margaret Dorothea Rowbotham (1883–1978), British engineer and women's rights campaigner
- Margaret Roxan (1924–2003), British archaeologist and expert on Roman military diplomas
- Margaret Rudin (born 1943), American murderer
- Margaret Rudkin (1897–1967), American businesswoman
- Margaret Runcie (1925–2022), pony breeder
- Margaret Fane Rutledge (1914–2004), Canadian pioneering pilot
- Margaret A. Ryan (born 1964), American judge
- Margaret Sachs, American lawyer
- Margaret Klein Salamon, clinical psychologist and climate activist
- Margaret Sanger (1879–1966), founder of the birth control movement in the United States
- Margaret Olivia Slocum Sage (1828–1918), American philanthropist who established the Russell Sage Foundation
- Margaret Sayers Peden (1927–2020), American translator and historian
- Margaret Sekaggya, Ugandan lawyer and human rights activist
- Margaret Sentamu Masagazi (born 1960), Ugandan media entrepreneur
- Margaret B. Seymour (born 1947), American judge
- Margaret Sheehan Blodgett (1897–1987), American attorney
- Margaret George Shello (1942–1969), Assyrian guerilla and Peshmerga commander
- Margaret Sibthorp, English feminist activist, writer, magazine editor and theosophist
- Margaret J.A. Simpson (1920–1996), Scottish-born New Zealand botanist, botanical collector and mountaineer
- Margaret Skinnider (1892–1971), Irish-Scottish revolutionary and feminist
- Margaret F. Slusher (1879–1971), American businesswoman
- Margaret Mary Smith (1916–1987), British ichthyologist and illustrator
- Margaret Sparrow (born 1935), New Zealand medical doctor, activist and author
- Margaret Elwyn Sparshott (1870–1940), British nurse
- Margaret Spellings (born 1957), American politician and educator
- Margaret Fulton Spencer (1882–1966), American architect and painter
- Margaret Stone (died 2021), Australian judge
- Margaret Strickland (born 1980), American judge
- Margaret Stumpp, American executive
- Margaret Suckley (1891–1991), American archivist
- Margaret Swain (1909–2002), English embroidery and textile historian
- Margaret M. Sweeney (born 1955), American judge
- Margaret Synge Dryer, Canadian architect
- Margaret Thomson (1902–1982), Scottish physician and prisoner of war
- Margaret Thorn (1897–1969), New Zealand bookkeeper, activist and welfare worker
- Margaret Townsend Jenkins (1843–1923), Welsh-born social reformer and educator
- Margaret Tracey (born 1967), American ballet dancer and educator
- Margaret Treuer (1943–2020), American judge and lawyer
- Margaret Trudeau (born 1948), ex-wife of the late Canadian prime minister Pierre Trudeau
- Margaret Van Alen Bruguiére (1876–1969), American socialite and art collector
- Margaret Van Pelt Vilas (1905–1995), American architect
- Margaret J. Vergeront (born 1946), American judge
- Margaret Waters (c. 1835–1870), English murderer
- Margaret Wearne (1893–1967), Australian trade unionist
- Margaret Werner Tobien (1921–1997), American gulag survivor
- Margaret West (1903–1963), American heiress and vaudeville performer
- Margaret Frances Wheeler, British woman who was kidnapped
- Margaret Roach Wheeler, Native American weaver and fashion designer
- Margaret White (born 1943), Australian judge
- Margaret Wilson (born 1953), Australian judge
- Margaret Windeyer (1866–1939), Australian librarian and feminist
- Margaret W. Wong (born 1950), American lawyer
- Margaret Wood, Navajo/Seminole fiber artist, fashion designer and quilt maker
- Margaret Woodbury Strong (1897–1969), American collector and philanthropist
- Margaret H. Woodward, U. S. Air Force general
- Margaret Workman (born 1947), American judge
- Margaret York (1941–2021), American police officer

== Fictional characters ==
- Margaret, Jake the Dog’s mother in the TV series Adventure Time
- Margaret in Much Ado About Nothing by William Shakespeare
- Margaret, a character in the Cartoon Network animated series Regular Show
- Mary Margaret Blanchard, a main character in ABC TV show Once Upon A Time, played by Ginnifer Goodwin
- Margaret "Peggy" Bundy, a character played by Katey Sagal in the 1987–97 Fox sitcom Married... with Children
- Margaret "Peggy" Carter, a character featured in several storylines published by Marvel Comics
- Margaret Fish, a chiropodist and a character in Bob and Margaret
- Magrat Garlick, a young witch in the Terry Pratchett Discworld novels
- Margaret Hale, heroine in Elizabeth Gaskell's 1855 novel North and South
- Margaret Hooper, secretary to White House Chiefs of Staff Leo McGarry and CJ Cregg played by NiCole Robinson in the TV series The West Wing
- Margaret "Maggie" Horton, a character on the soap opera Days of Our Lives
- Margaret Houlihan, character in both the movie and television show M*A*S*H
- Margaret Mildred "Kit" Kittredge, in the Kit Kittredge series of American Girl books and related toys
- Margaret "Meg" March, character in Little Women by Louisa May Alcott
- Margaret "Maggie" Mathison, character in Homeland
- Margaret Moonlight, a boss in the Suda 51 game No More Heroes 2: Desperate Struggle
- Margaret "Peggy" Olson, a central character in the AMC series Mad Men
- Mistress Margaret Page in The Merry Wives of Windsor by William Shakespeare
- Margaret Evelyn "Maggie" Simpson in the TV show The Simpsons
- Margaret Sawyer, character in DC Comics and a supporting character in Superman and Batman
- Margaret SquarePants, SpongeBob's mother and Harold's wife in SpongeBob SquarePants
- Margaret White, a character Stephen King's Carrie
- Margaret "Peggy" Woolley, a character in the BBC radio serial The Archers
- Margaret "Peggy" Hill, a character in the TV show King of the Hill

== See also ==
- Lady Margaret (disambiguation)
