= Margaret Brennan (nun) =

Margaret Brennan (1 July 1831 – 23 August 1887), born in Kingston, Upper Canada, was known as Sister Teresa, and she became a member of the Sisters of St. Joseph in 1852. At that time, the order was just establishing itself in Canada.

Sister Teresa helped lay the foundation of the Sisters of St. Joseph in Ontario, which spread to the western provinces and the Northwest Territories. The sisters still serve in the fields of education, health care, and social work.
