= Margaret Hadley Foster =

American journalist and clubwoman, Houston's first paid librarian (1843–1920)

- Born: May 18, 1843; Houston, Texas, U.S.
- Died: January 13, 1920
- Occupations: Journalist; librarian; clubwoman
- Known for: First paid librarian in Houston; founder of the Houston Civic Club; society editor of the Houston Post
- Spouse: William Kellam Foster (d. 1881)
- Children: 4 (2 deceased young)

Margaret Hadley Foster (May 18, 1843 – January 13, 1920) was a journalist and clubwoman, known for being Houston's first paid librarian.

The Lyceum had been a private men's reading club that voted to admit women in 1887. Foster was hired as its first librarian at $25 per month. In 1889, the Ladies Reading Club was successful in lobbying the City Council to allot $200 for the Lyceum, making it a public institution. The Lyceum later merged with the Houston Public Library in 1904.

Foster used her position as society editor of the Houston Post to promote the formation of the Houston Civic Club, Houston’s first civic club. Its goal was to create smaller groups which would clean and beautify each of the six wards the city. They funded the creation of several city parks acting "in essence as a city recreation department." In an article for The Key to the City of Houston, a souvenir magazine created by the City Federation of Clubs in 1908, Foster stated that the two greatest charms of Houston were "the people and the trees."

Foster also sponsored and edited a weekly page in the Houston Post entitled “Our Young Folks” for the purpose of creating a space for the Happyhammers Club, a junior civics club, to exchange ideas and participate in contests. She received a commendation for this work from the Texas State Historical Association in 1899.

Foster was one of the founding members of the Lady Washington Chapter Daughters of the American Revolution and served as its corresponding secretary. She was also the founder of the Robert E. Lee Chapter 186, Texas Division of the United Daughters of the Confederacy in 1897, serving as its first vice president and secretary.

== Personal life ==
Foster was born Margaret Hadley in Houston, Texas, to Colonel T. B. J. Hadley and Piety Lucretia Smith. She was married to William Kellam Foster and they had four sons, two of whom died young. Her husband died in New Orleans in 1881. Foster moved to San Francisco, California and returned to Houston around 1894. Her oldest son, Paul Hadley Foster, was the American consul in Spain, and Foster served as his hostess from 1914 through 1918, sending reports back to the Houston Chronicle.
