= Margaret Kennix =

English physician (died 1585)

Margaret Kennix (?–1585) was a Dutch informal medical practitioner who practiced medicine without a license in 16th-century Elizabethan London. She practiced medicine without formal schooling or a medical license during a time when many people relied on informal healers for medical care. Kennix was censured repeatedly by the Royal College of Physicians but supported by Queen Elizabeth I.

== Personal details ==
Kennix was not native to London, and she was known as a Dutch empiric who practiced medicine from practice experience rather than formal medial training. It is believed that she lived on the street of Old Seacole Lane in London.

She was an unlicensed medical practitioner during the Elizabethan Era in London. Her work mainly involved treating impoverished patients, and the income she earned from her medical practice financially supported her household. Kennix's healing methods included herbal remedies called "simples", wound care, and traditional folk practices based on traditional experience rather than formal education.

== Career and difficulties ==
Margaret Kennix had her own medical practice from 1571 to 1585.

Margaret Kennix dealt with issues regarding her authority to practice medicine in London. She particularly dealt with the Royal College of Physicians, then called the "President and College or Commonalty of the Faculty of Physic in London", which at the time had a strong presence in the city. King Henry VII established it as a Royal Charter in 1518. The Royal College of Physicians was one of the main governing bodies in the field of medicine within.

The College of Physicians repeatedly tried to shut down Kennix and her medical practice because she lacked a valid medical license. The college attempted to put a complete stop to Margaret's medical practice. The College argued that Kennix’s medical practice was dangerous because she was unlicensed and outside the control of a medical institution.

Margaret Kennix turned to the royal family for help after the college had consistently attempted to shut down her practice entirely. Margaret knew that having someone in the royal family vouching for her was very beneficial.

Queen Elizabeth I informed the college in 1581 of her support for Margaret Kennix. Sir Francis Walsingham informed the College of Queen Elizabeth's support for Margaret, and he listed two separate reasons as to why she should be allowed to practice medicine. The first reason was, "God has given her a special knowledge to the benefit of the poorer sort". He also informed the college that her family, "wholly depend on the exercise of her skill".

The college responded to this act of support with a resounding and stout answer. The writer for the college said that Margaret Kennix was an "outlandish, ignorant, sorry woman". The college also suggested that allowing Margaret Kennix to practice medicine would set a harmful standard and would be breaking the "Wholesome Laws" that prevent medical practices foreign to the College. The College believed her "weakness and insufficiency" were enough to warrant such a response.

The final decision of the College remains unknown. Historians believe Kennix either continued practicing medicine in secret, was allowed to continue to practice, or was forced to stop.

== Conflict with the Royal College of Physicians ==
The Royal College of Physicians viewed Margaret Kennix as part of a growing problem of empirics and unlicensed practitioners in Elizabethan London. College officials described Kennix as an “outlandish, ignorant, sorry woman” and argued that her medical work threatened established medical authority.

The conflict reflected broader tensions between licensed physicians and informal healers who relied on practical experience and herbal remedies instead of formal medical training.

== Support from Elizabeth I ==
Queen Elizabeth I supported Margaret Kennix’s right to continue practicing medicine despite opposition from the College of Physicians. Through Sir Francis Walsingham, the Queen stated that Kennix possessed a God-given ability to heal and that her medical work benefited poorer patients.

Royal officials also emphasized that Kennix’s family depended financially on her healing work because her husband was unable to work.
