= Margaret A. Berger =

Professor of Law at Brooklyn Law School

- Born: 1932; Vienna, Austria
- Died: November 18, 2010 (aged 77–78); New York City
- Education: Radcliffe College, Columbia University School of Law
- Occupation(s): lawyer and professor

Margaret A. Berger (1932 – 18 November 2010) was a law professor who specialized in evidence. She also taught civil procedure, and the intersection of science and the law.

== Biography ==
Berger was born in Vienna, Austria, in 1932.

She attended Radcliffe College (A.B.; magna cum laude) and the Columbia University School of Law (J.D.). She became a member of the New York bar in 1956.

Berger was the Suzanne J. and Norman Miles Professor of Law at Brooklyn Law School. She taught evidence, civil procedure, and the intersection of science and the law at Brooklyn Law School, beginning in 1973. She retired from teaching full time in 2008.

She was the Reporter to the Advisory Committee on the Federal Rules of Evidence. She co-authored Weinstein's Evidence and Evidence Casebook, among other writings, and authored or co-authored 35 law review articles.

Berger received the 1998 Francis Rawle Award from the American Law Institute/American Bar Association for outstanding contributions to post-admission legal education.

Berger died 18 November 2010.
