= Margaret Burges =

Scottish woman executed for witchcraft (b. 1579, d. 1629)

Margaret Burges (c. 1579 – January 1629), also known as 'Lady Dalyell', was a Scottish businesswoman from Nether Cramond who was found guilty of witchcraft and executed in Edinburgh in 1629.

== Personal life ==
Burges was married to a boatman named John Gillespie before her second husband, John Dalyell. She was a successful figure in middle-class Cramond business, renting property to several tenants and employing a number of servants.

== Trial and execution ==
Burges was first accused of witchcraft following a dispute in front of her home. Burges had sent away a beggar named Elspeth Baird for her 'evil brint.' As revenge, Baird accused Burges of witchcraft. Burges then attempted to clear her name by filing a slander suit, which backfired and led to her trial and eventual execution. From testimony in the slander suit, the Cramond Kirk Session determined there was sufficient evidence against Burges for a formal investigation by the Privy Council. This testimony included a line of questioning with Burges' teenaged servant, who claimed that Burges had kissed her repeatedly on many occasions. Further evidence against Burges was a Devil's mark located on her leg. Following her trial on 27 January 1629 she was strangled and burnt on Castle Hill in Edinburgh.
