= Margaret (the Lame) of Magdeburg =

Margaret “the Lame” of Magdeburg (1210–1250) was an anchoress of the St. Albans Church in Magdeburg. There she spent her days and years in total renunciation of the world in order to give honor to God. People believed she received visions from the Lord and her experiences were later documented in Vita Margaretae Contractae.

== Early life and seclusion ==
Margaret was a deformed child, born in the urban society of Magdeburg, the capital of Saxony-Anhalt, Germany, around the time of 1210. Magdeburg was a prosperous city situated on the Elbe River and the seat of an archbishopric. It is unknown what her ailment was but it is strongly suggested that she was born with it. Her family was relatively wealthy, but shunned Margaret and her deformation. She was often seen attending church with a blind servant in her early childhood.

Spurned and mocked for her deformity both by her community and family, Margaret found companionship and solace in her relationship with God. She accepted their mockery saying, “Why do you stand around staring at us? You are merely seeing God’s martyrs. Don’t neglect your duties.” Margaret truly viewed herself as one of God's martyrs and happily endured any suffering sent her way. In 1222, at age twelve Margaret chose to be cloistered as an anchoress to better worship the Lord.

Margaret choose to become an anchoress during a time when this lifestyle had hit its peak. The 12th and 13th centuries saw the highest number of women becoming anchoresses. Her mother helped arrange an anchorhold for her in St. Albans Church on Broadway near the Magdeburg Cathedral. Margaret did not choose the community life of a nun but the complete reclusive life devoted entirely to prayer to God. She was enclosed in a small cell in the church that had only two small windows. One faced the church and altar allowing her to partake in ceremonies. The other window is covered with dark cloth but allowed her to speak with those who came to her cell seeking advice, which many people sought from this anchoress.

Sometime in her early enclosure she learned to read. Her Vita claims that she believed she was taught by Mary, the Mother of Christ. Her desire to go into the church was not to bring honor and privilege to her family but to give God due glory. She shunned the common practice of charity and showed her devotion through self-emaciation. People often came to her and shared their troubles. Margaret saw her purpose was to teach others about the tenets of Christianity and help their religious self-expression. Margaret's message is that it is suffering and desolation, not sweetness or consolation, that will bring you to God. She had the ear of many people who sympathized with her and viewed her as a saint.

== The Life of Margaret the Lame ==
Two years after Margaret's enclosure when she was 14, the friar Johannes of the Dominican Order came to serve as her confessor. Initially he cared little for her suffering as her beliefs contrasted with his own religious practices. John tried to get her to follow popular ascetic practices such as fasting and sleep deprivation. She obliged for a time, but these methods damaged her already frail health. Soon though he began to understand her beliefs and came to view her as a blessed woman destined to become a saint. Around 1250 Johannes recorded some of her spiritual teachings and practices in a hagiography that is the source of most of our information about her.

For a period of three years Johannes refused to see Margaret though she desired to speak to him. He later came to regret this time spent away from her. While Johannes was away Margaret felt as though she were under the tutelage of the Blessed Virgin and Jesus Christ. Often Johannes wrote that Margaret suffered great pains and torment that she believed were sent by God to purify her soul. She often spoke of visions sent to her from Christ through which she outlined her teachings of the basic tenets of Christianity. Margaret's Vita was a rarity in that she was alive while it was being written. Therefore, she was able to tell Johannes what she desired in her Vita.

In her Vita Margaret included her teachings of worship and the five things required for prayer. First, pray humbly, as we are not worthy for our prayers to be heard. Second, we must direct our fervent desire to him. Thirdly, pray wisely and ensure that your prayer is not for your consolation, but only to offer God praise, glory and honor. Fourth, pray faithfully. Fifth, you must persevere in prayer.

== Leaving Magdeburg ==
Though she had the ear of many of the people who came to her for guidance, the established clergy in Magdeburg held little trust for Margaret. Clerics grew suspicious of her supposed sufferings that would abruptly end as soon as someone approached her cell seeking counsel. The clergy wanted her to leave and encouraged Johannes to have her removed from her cell. Fearing for her safety, he agreed and arranged for a cell for her in his old Dominican convent.

Margaret fiercely protested being removed but understood that the clergy held her in contempt. She finally agreed to be moved to the new Saint-Agnes convent in the nearby community of Neustadt. She remained there for the rest of her life. After her transfer to Neustadt Margaret focused on her prayer and devotion to the Lord, seeing people less often. Johannes did not include any writings of her death in Margaret's Vita. She died sometime after 1245 around the age of 40.
