= Margaret Mannah-Macarthy =

Sierra Leonean midwife

Margaret Titty Mannah-Macarthy is a Sierra Leonean midwife. She was, according to the UNFPA, one of the driving factors behind the professionalization of midwifery in Sierra Leone.

== Life ==
Margaret Mannah Macarthy has worked as a midwife in Sierra Leone throughout her career, including under the Ebola outbreak in West Africa. Mannah-Macarthy pushed for the establishment of two training schools for midwives, and was an important factor behind a sevenfold increase in graduation rates for midwives in the country between 2010 – when the number was fewer than 100 – and 2018. In this regard, UNFPA has seen her as an instrumental factor for scaling up the midwife profession in Sierra Leone.

She has also worked as a midwife adviser for UNFPA, being employed by the UNFPA Sierra Leone office.
