= Margaret Dixon McDougall =

19th-century writer

Margaret Dixon McDougall (December 26, 1828 – October 22, 1899) was an Irish-born writer who lived in Canada and the United States. Her surname also appears as MacDougall. She sometimes wrote under the name Norah Pembroke.

The daughter of William Henry Dixon and Eleanor West, she was born Margaret Moran Dixon in Belfast and came to Canada with her family while she was in her twenties. She married Alexander Dougald McDougal in 1852; the couple had six children. During the 1860s and 1870s, they lived in Pembroke and Clarence. McDougall published a book of poetry Verses and Rhymes by the Way in 1880. She wrote for various newspapers and then returned to Ireland as a correspondent for the Montreal Witness and the New York Witness during the early 1880s. In 1882, she published The Letters of "Norah" on Her Tour Through Ireland, based on material published in her columns. In 1883, she published a novel Days of a Life set in Ireland. After her husband died in 1887, she became active in the American Baptist Home Mission Society in Michigan.

In 1893, McDougall moved to Montesano, Washington where she worked for the church. She died in Seattle in 1899.
