= Margaret Daube-Witherspoon =

American biomedical engineer

Margaret E. Daube-Witherspoon is an American biomedical engineer specializing in positron emission tomography. She holds the position of "senior research investigator extraordinaire" with the PennPET Explorer project in the Department of Radiology of the Perelman School of Medicine at the University of Pennsylvania.

== Education and career ==
Daube-Witherspoon majored in physics at Swarthmore College, graduating in 1978. She completed a Ph.D. in physics in 1983 at the University of Wisconsin–Madison.

After postdoctoral research from 1983 to 1986 with Gerd Muehllehner at the University of Pennsylvania, she worked in the National Institutes of Health from 1986 until 1998, before returning to her present position at the University of Pennsylvania.

She was president of the Physics, Instrumentation and Data Sciences Council of the Society of Nuclear Medicine and Molecular Imaging from 1995 to 1997.

== Recognition ==
Daube-Witherspoon was elected as an IEEE Fellow, in the 2023 class of fellows, "for contributions to 3D image reconstruction in PET and corrections for physics effects".
