= Margaret Nyagahura =

Rwandan politician

Margaret Nyagahura was a senator in the parliament of Rwanda. Nyagahura was appointed by Paul Kagame.
