= Margaret Chabot =

American hotel owner

Margaret Chabot (1752-1819) was an American hotel owner. She was the founder and manager of the famous Rising Sun Hotel on Conti Street in the French Quarter of New Orleans, which became a well known spot for foreign travellers and wealthy guests in the city in the early 19th-century.

Margaret Clark (also called Clar, Clacque, Clercke) was from Ireland and emigrated to New Orleans, where she married Claude Chabot (also called Chabaud, Chabaut, Shabot) in 1783.

She became a widow in 1791, and bought a building from Louis Macarty in 1796, where she opened her hotel the same year. The hotel has been described by the British traveller Francis Baily in 1797. Among her guests were the explorer William Clark, who stayed there in 1798. It has been described as a luxurious establishment, with a garden and musical entertainment.

Chabot became a rich woman on her business and retired in 1809, leaving the business to be managed by her daughter Celeste Chabot. Her hotel is known under the name Rising Sun Hotel from that year. It burnt down in 1822.
