= Maggie =

- Gender: Female
- Language: English

Other names
- Alternative spelling: Maggy, Meggie
- Variant form: Maddie
- Related names: Margaret, Magdalena, Madeline, Magnolia, Marigold

Maggie or Maggy is a feminine given name. It can be a short form of Magdalena, Magnolia, Margaret, or Marigold.

== People ==
=== Maggie ===
- Maggie Adamson, Scottish musician
- Maggie Aderin (born 1968), British scientist
- Maggie Alderson (born 1959), Australian author
- Maggie Alphonsi (born 1983), English rugby union player
- Maggie Anderson, several people
- Maggie Anwer, Egyptian-Italian director, producer and writer
- Maggie Appleton, museum director
- Maggie Atkinson (born 1956), English educator
- Maggie Baird (born 1959), American actress
- Maggie Bandur (born 1974), American television writer
- Maggie Barrie (born 1996), Sierra Leonean sprinter
- Maggie Barry (born 1959), New Zealand politician
- Maggie Batson (born 2003), American actress
- Maggie Baylis (1912–1997), American graphic designer
- Maggie Beer (born 1945), Australian cook
- Maggie Behle (born 1980), American Paralympic alpine skier
- Maggie Bell (born 1945), Scottish vocalist
- Maggie Benedict (born 1981), South African actress
- Maggie Betts, American filmmaker
- Maggie Björklund, Danish guitarist
- Maggie Black (1930–2015), American ballet teacher
- Maggie Black Kettle, Canadian actress and community leader
- Maggie Blanc, American television producer
- Maggie De Block (born 1962), Belgian politician
- Maggie Blye (1942–2016), American actress
- Maggie Borg (1952–2004), Maltese activist
- Maggie Bowen (1956–2014), English and London-born folk singer
- Maggie Boyle (1956–2014), English singer
- Maggie Boyce, British Evacuee during WW2.
- Maggie Bridges (born 1992), American beauty pageant titleholder
- Maggie Brown (born 1948), American playwright
- Maggie Brown (singer) (born 1963), American singer
- Maggie Browne (1864–1937), English author
- Maggie Butt, British poet
- Maggie Calloway (1910–2000), Filipino actress
- Maggie Campbell-Culver, English historian
- Maggie Carey (born 1975), American director
- Maggie Carlton (born 1957), American politician
- Maggie Carver (born 1964), English businesswoman
- Maggie Cassella, American-Canadian actress
- Maggie Castle (born 1983), Canadian actress
- Maggie Chan (athlete) (born 1975), Hong Kong long-distance runner
- Maggie Chan (politician) (1969), Hong Kong solicitor and politician
- Maggie Chapman (born 1979), Zimbabwean-Scottish politician
- Maggie Chapman (singer) (born 1997), American singer-songwriter
- Maggie Chen (born 1957), Chinese actress
- Maggie Cheng, applied mathematician, computer scientist and network scientist
- Maggie Cheung (born 1964), Hong Kong actress
- Maggie Cheung Ho-yee (born 1969), Hong Kong actress
- Maggie Chi, Canadian politician
- Maggie Chiang (born 1980), Taiwanese singer
- Maggie Civantos (born 1984), Spanish actress
- Maggie Clark (born 2007), Australian cricketer
- Maggie Cline (1857–1934), American singer
- Maggie Cogan (born 1943), American resident
- Maggie Coles-Lyster (born 1999), Canadian cyclist
- Maggie Collins, Australian announcer
- Maggie Connor (born 1963), American freestyle skier
- Maggie Cronin, Irish actress
- Maggie Crotty (1948–2020), Democratic member
- Maggie Cusack, English professor
- Maggie Davies (born 1984), British skeleton racer
- Maggie Davis, British politician
- Maggie Deahm (1938–2015), Australian politician
- Maggie Dence (born 1942), Australian film actress
- Maggie Dent (born 1955), Australian author
- Maggie Diaz (1925–2016), Australian photographer
- Maggie Dickson, Scottish salt maker
- Maggie Dixon (1977–2006), American basketball player
- Maggie Doyne (born 1987), American philanthropist
- Maggie Eckford (born c. 1986), stage name Ruelle (singer), American singer-songwriter
- Maggie Edmond (born 1946), Australian architect
- Maggie Eisner (1947–2022), British general practitioner
- Maggie Estep (1963–2014), American writer
- Maggie Ewen (born 1994), American athlete
- Maggie Feng, American chess player
- Maggie Ferguson (born 1952), Australian violinist
- Maggie Fergusson, British biographer and editor
- Maggie Fitzgibbon (1929–2020), Australian actress
- Maggie Flaherty (born 2000), American ice hockey player
- Maggie Flecknoe (born 1983), American voice actress
- Maggie Ford (1928–2020), British writer
- Maggie Friedman, American screenwriter
- Maggie Culver Fry, American poet
- Maggie Furey (1955–2016), British writer
- Maggie Gallagher (born 1960), American writer
- Maggie Gee (novelist) (born 1948), English novelist
- Maggie Gee (pilot) (1923–2013), American aviator
- Maggie Geha (born 1988), American actress
- Maggie George, American educator
- Maggie Wallace Glover (born 1948), American politician
- Maggie Gobran (born 1949), Egyptian Coptic Orthodox consecrated servant, non-profit charity founder and CEO and professor of computer science
- Maggie Goodlander (born 1986), American lawyer
- Maggie Gordon-Smith, British track cyclist
- Maggie Govender, South African politician
- Maggie Grace (born 1983), American actress
- Maggie Gray, American set decorator
- Maggie Greenwald (born 1955), American filmmaker
- Maggie Grey (born 2010), Australian diver
- Maggie Grindatti (born 1992), Brazilian jiu-jitsu practitioner
- Maggie Gripenberg (1881–1976), Finnish dancer
- Maggie Gyllenhaal (born 1977), American actress
- Maggie Haberman (born 1973), American journalist
- Maggie Hadleigh-West (born 1958), American filmmaker
- Maggie Hall (1853–1888), Irish prostitute
- Maggie Hamilton (1867–1952), Scottish artist
- Maggie Han (born 1959), American actress
- Maggie Haney (born 1978), American coach
- Maggie Hannan (born 1962), English poet
- Maggie Hardy (born 1965), American businesswoman
- Maggie Harris, Guyanese poet, writer and visual artist
- Maggie Hassan (born 1958), American attorney and politician
- Maggie Hathaway (1911–2001), American singer
- Maggie Helwig (born 1961), Canadian poet
- Maggie Hemingway (1946–1993), British novelist
- Maggie Hickey (born 1946), Australian politician
- Maggie Hill (1898–1949), English career criminal
- Maggie Hogan (born 1979), American Olympic athlete
- Maggie Holland, English singer-songwriter
- Maggie Humm, English feminist academic
- Maggie Jackson, English netball international and coach
- Maggie Jeffus (born 1934), Democratic educator
- Maggie Jenkins (born 2001), New Zealand footballer
- Maggie Pogue Johnson, American poet
- Maggie Jones, Baroness Jones of Whitchurch (born 1955), British politician
- Maggie Elizabeth Jones (born 2003), American child actress
- Maggie Jones (actress) (1934–2009), British actress
- Maggie Jones (blues musician) (1894–1940), American blues singer and pianist
- Maggie Keenan-Bolger, American dramatist
- Maggie Kernan, former First Lady of Indiana
- Maggie Keskinen (born 1990), Finnish politician
- Maggie Keswick Jencks (1941–1995), Scottish writer, artist and garden designer
- Maggie Kigozi (born 1950), Ugandan physician, business consultant and sportswoman
- Maggie Kilgour (born 1957), Canadian professor
- Maggie King (1940–2020), Australian actress
- Maggie Kirkpatrick (born 1941), Australian actress
- Maggie Knight, New Zealand Australian actor
- Maggie Hardy Knox (born 1965), American billionaire businesswoman
- Maggie Koerth, American science journalist
- Maggie Kuhn (1905–1995), American activist
- Maggie LaGue, American ice hockey defender
- Maggie Lau (born 1982), Hong Kong musical artist
- Maggie Laubser (1886–1973), South African painter and printmaker
- Maggie Lawson (born 1980), American actress
- Maggie Leones (1920–2016), Filipino intelligence officer
- Maggie Lettvin (born 1927), American writer
- Maggie Lim (1913–1995), Singaporean politician
- Maggie Lindemann (born 1998), American singer
- Maggie Lloyd-Williams (born 1975), Zimbabwean actress
- Maggie Louie (born 1970), American singer
- Maggie Lucas (born 1991), American basketball player and coach
- Maggie Lynes (born 1963), British athletics competitor
- Maggie MacDonald, Canadian musician
- Maggie Macdonald, Scottish Gaelic musician
- Maggie MacDonnell, Canadian educator
- Maggie MacInnes (born 1963), British singer
- Maggie MacNeal (born 1950), Dutch singer
- Maggie Mac Neil (born 2000), Canadian swimmer
- Maggie Mae (singer) (1960–2021), German singer
- Maggie Malone-Hardin (born 1993), American javelin thrower
- Maggie Mason, American writer
- Maggie Maunye, South African politician
- Maggie McCurdy (born 1932), American sculptor
- Maggie McEleny, Scottish swimmer
- Maggie McIntosh (born 1947), American politician
- Maggie McNamara (1928–1978), American actress
- Maggie McOmie (born 1941), American actress
- Maggie Michael (born 1974), American painter
- Maggie Michael (journalist), Egyptian journalist
- Maggie Millar (born 1941), Australian actress
- Maggie Miller (mathematician), American mathematician
- Maggie Mitchell (1832–1918), American actress
- Maggie Mitchell (artist), British artist
- Maggie Moffat (1873–1943), British suffragist
- Maggie Moloney, Australian rugby league player
- Maggie Moone (born 1953), British singer
- Maggie Moore (1851–1926), Australian actress
- Maggie Naouri (born 1989), Australian actress
- Maggie Nelson (born 1973), American writer
- Maggie Ng, Hong Kong tennis player
- Maggie Nichols (gymnast) (born 1997), American artistic gymnast
- Maggie Nicols or Nichols (born 1948), Scottish singer, dancer and performer
- Maggie Noach (1949–2006), English literary agent
- Maggie Norris, American fashion designer
- Maggie Nurrenbern, American politician
- Maggie O'Carroll, social entrepreneur
- Maggie O'Connor, American singer-songwriter
- Maggie O'Farrell (born 1972), Irish-British novelist
- Maggie Blue O'Hara (born 1975), Canadian actress
- Maggie O'Kane, Irish filmmaker and journalist
- Maggie O'Neill (born 1962, British actress
- Maggie O'Sullivan, British poet, performer and visual artist
- Maggie Oliver (actor) (1844–1892), Australian actor and comedian
- Maggie Toulouse Oliver, American politician
- Maggie Ollerenshaw (born 1949), English actress
- Maggie Orth (born 1964), American artist and technologist
- Maggie Paul, indigenous Passamaquoddy elder
- Maggie Pescetto (born 2000), Italian sailor
- Maggie Peterson (1941–2022), American television actress
- Maggie Philbin (born 1955), English television presenter
- Maggie Phillips (born 1951), British rower
- Maggie Pierce (actress), American actress
- Maggie Pierce (soccer) (born 2001), American soccer player
- Maggie Porter (1853–1942), American singer
- Maggie Q (born 1979), American actress Margaret Quigley
- Maggie Qin (born 1989), Chinese actress
- Maggie Rae, British sociologist
- Maggie Ratsoma, South African politician
- Maggie Reilly (born 1956), Scottish singer
- Maggie Reese, American sport shooter
- Maggie Renzi (born 1951), American film producer
- Maggie Resha (1923–2003), South African anti-apartheid activist
- Maggie de la Riva (born 1942), Filipina film actress
- Maggie Rizer (born 1978), American model
- Maggie Rogers (born 1994), American musician
- Maggie Rogers (White House maid) (1874–1953), housemaid in the White House
- Maggie Rose (born 1988), American singer
- Maggie Napaljarri Ross, Australian artist
- Maggie Roswell (born 1952), American actress
- Maggie Ryder, British singer-songwriter
- Maggie Sajak (born 1995), American country music singer
- Maggie Sansone, American musician
- Maggie Savoy (1917–1970), American newspaper editor
- Maggie Scarf (born 1932), American writer, journalist and lecturer
- Maggie Scott, Lady Scott, Scottish lawyer and judge
- Maggie Shayne (born 1962), American author
- Maggie Shea (born 1989), American sailor
- Maggie Shipstead, American novelist
- Maggie Shiu (born 1965), Hong Kong actress
- Maggie Shnayerson (born 1981), American journalist and blogger
- Maggie Siff (born 1974), American actress
- Maggie Siggins (born 1942), Canadian journalist and writer
- Maggie Simpson (musician), American singer-songwriter
- Maggie Smith (1934–2024), English actress
- Maggie Smith (poet), American poet, freelance writer, and editor
- Maggie Sotyu (born 1957), South African politician
- Maggie Stables (died 2014), British actress
- Maggie Steber, American documentary photographer
- Maggie Steed (born 1946), English actress and comedian
- Maggie Steffens (born 1993), American water polo player
- Maggie Stiefvater (born 1981), American author
- Maggie Szabo (born 1990), Canadian musical artist
- Maggie Tabberer (1936–2024), Australian fashion personality
- Maggie Tallerman, British linguist
- Maggie Taylor, American photographer
- Maggie Telfer (1959–2023), British health activist
- Maggie Teyte (1888–1976), English operatic soprano
- Margaret Thatcher (1925–2013), the first female UK prime minister
- Maggie Thompson (born 1942), American editor and columnist
- Maggie Thompson (artist), Native American textile artist and designer
- Maggie Thrash, American young adult fiction author and memoirist
- Maggie Thrett (1946–2022), American actress
- Maggie Throup (born 1957), British Conservative Politician and MP for Erewash
- Maggie Tinsman (born 1936), American politician
- Maggie Tokuda-Hall, American author of children's and young adult novels
- Maggie Tomecka (born 1982), Polish American soccer midfielder
- Maggie Van Ostrand, American humorist
- Maggie Vespa, American journalist
- Maggie Vessey (born 1981), American middle-distance runner
- Maggie Voisin (born 1998), American freeskier
- Maggie de Vries (born 1961), Canadian writer
- Maggie Axe Wachacha (1894–1993), Eastern Band Cherokee woman
- Maggie L. Walker (1864–1934), African-American businesswoman
- Maggie Walters, American singer
- Maggie Weston (make-up artist) (born 1948), British makeup artist
- Maggie Wheeler (born 1961), American actress
- Maggie Wilderotter (born 1955), American businessperson
- Maggie Will (born 1964), American professional golfer
- Maggie Williams (born 1954), American political consultant
- Maggie Wilson (born 1989), Filipino-British beauty queen, TV personality, actress, model and entrepreneur
- Maggie Wu (actress) (born 1983), Taiwanese actress and model
- Maggie Wu (businesswoman) (born 1969), Chinese business executive, CFO of Alibaba

=== Maggy ===
- Maggy (マギー, Magī, born 1992), stage name of Japanese model Natsuki Margaret Gibb ( ギブ・奈月・マーガレット, Gibu Natsuki Māgaretto)
- Maggy Ashmawy (born 1992), Egyptian sport shooter
- Maggy Baum (born 1931), Belgian designer and knitwear/textiles specialist
- Maggy Breittmayer (1888–1961), Swiss violinist
- Maggy de Coster (born 1962), French writer
- Maggy Hurchalla (1940–2022), American environmental activist
- Maggy Nagel (born 1957), Luxembourgish politician
- Maggy Rouff (1896–1971), French fashion designer
- Maggy Wauters (born 1953), Belgian athlete
- Maggy Whitehouse (born 1956), British priest

== Fictional characters ==
=== Maggie ===
- Maggie Beare, of the Australian television series Mother and Son
- Captain Maggie Beckett, from the American television series Sliders
- Maggie Blackamoor, character from the British sketch-comedy programme Little Britain
- Maggie Blume, from the California Diaries books
- Maggie Cadabby, Abby Cadabby's mother in Sesame Street
- Margarita Luisa "Maggie" Chascarrillo, in the Love and Rockets (comics)
- Maggie Doyle, from the Australian police drama Blue Heelers
- Maggie Greene, from the franchise The Walking Dead
- Maggie Lee, Asian character on the PBS animated television series Maya and Miguel
- Maggie O'Connell, a main character on the television series Northern Exposure
- Margaret "Maggie" Pollitt (also called "Maggie the Cat"), from Tennessee Williams' 1955 play, Cat on a Hot Tin Roof.
- Maggie Pesky, on the short-lived animated television series The Buzz on Maggie
- Maggie Horton, on the soap opera Days of Our Lives
- Maggie Pierce, on the television series Grey's Anatomy
- Maggie Sawyer, police officer in The CW series Supergirl
- Maggie Schultz, titlular character of the 1990 children's book Muggie Maggie by Beverly Cleary
- Maggie Sheffield, from the sitcom The Nanny
- Maggie Simpson, from the animated television series The Simpsons
- Maggie Sloane, from the Australian television series A Country Practice
- Maggie Stone, on the American soap opera All My Children
- Margarita "Maggie" Emilia Vera, in the 2018 rebooted television series Charmed
- Maggie Wahlgren, on the animated television series The Loud House
- Maggie Walsh, on the television series Buffy the Vampire Slayer
- Maggie Winslow, from the 1975 musical A Chorus Line.
- Maggie & Sam, two Woody Woodpecker characters
- Maggie, a main character in the American comic strip Bringing Up Father
- Maggie, the English name for the Cardcaptor Sakura character Maki Matsumoto
- Maggie, the human protagonist of the Canadian preschool animated television series Maggie and the Ferocious Beast
- Maggie, supporting character in the 2003 Japanese anime Gungrave
- Maggie, from the 2004 Disney animated film Home on the Range
- Maggie, from the Papa Louie video games
- Maggie, from Woody Woodpecker Goes to Camp

=== Maggy ===
- Maggy Moulach, a creature in Scottish folklore
- Maggy (Monica's Gang), Brazilian comic book character, created by Mauricio de Sousa

== Other ==
- Maggie the Macaque, a monkey from the Bowmanville Zoo, Toronto, Canada, known for making hockey predictions
- "Maggie" (The Afterparty), the eighth episode and first-season finale of the murder mystery comedy-drama series The Afterparty

== See also ==
- Mars Aerial and Ground Global Intelligent Explorer (MAGGIE)
- Maggy (disambiguation)
