= Maggie Wu =

Maggie Wu may refer to:

- Maggie Wu (businesswoman) (born 1969), Chinese business executive, CFO of Alibaba
- Maggie Wu (actress) (born 1983), Taiwanese actress and model
