= Maggy =

Maggy may refer to:

== Given name ==
- Maggy (model) (born 1992), Canadian-Japanese model
- Maggy Ashmawy (born 1992), Egyptian sport shooter
- Maggy Breittmayer (1888–1961), Swiss violinist
- Maggy de Coster (born 1962), French writer
- Maggy Hurchalla (born 1940), American environmental activist
- Maggy Nagel (born 1957), Luxembourgish politician
- Maggy Rouff (1896–1971), French fashion designer
- Maggy Wauters (born 1953), Belgian athlete
- Maggy Whitehouse (born 1956), British priest

== Surname ==
- Shinji Maggy (born 1973), Japanese comedian

== Fictional characters ==
- Maggy Moulach, a creature in Scottish folklore
- Maggy (Monica's Gang), Brazilian comic book character, created by Mauricio de Souza

== See also ==
- Maggie (disambiguation)
