= Margaret Simpson (disambiguation) =

Margaret Simpson (born 1981) is a Ghanaian heptathlete.

Margaret Simpson may also refer to:

- Margaret E. B. Simpson (1906-1994), Scottish archaeologist.
- Maggie Simpson, a fictional character in the animated television series The Simpsons.
- Maggie Simpson (musician), American acoustic guitarist and singer.
