= 武 =

武 may refer to:

- Bu of Wa, ancient Japanese king
- Wu (surname 武), Chinese surname
