= Garden tourism =

Tourism about gardening history

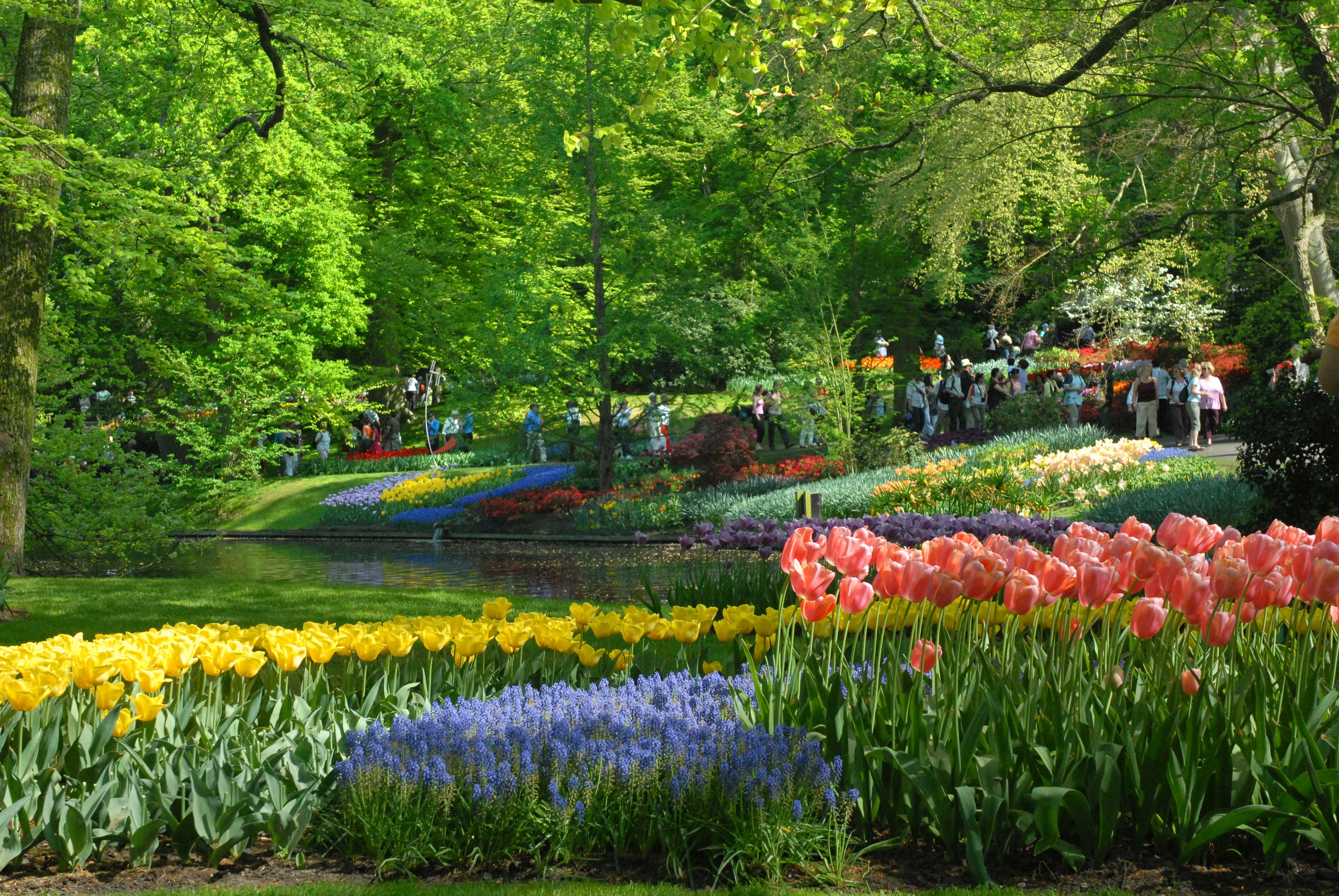
Tourists at the Keukenhof gardens

Garden tourism is a type of niche tourism involving visits to famous gardens and botanical gardens and places which are significant in the history of gardening. Garden tourists often travel individually in countries with which they are familiar but often prefer to join organized garden tours in countries where they might experience difficulties with language, travel or finding accommodation in the vicinity of the garden. In the year 2000 the Alhambra and the Taj Mahal both received over two million visitors. This poses problems for the landscape manager.

Probably the oldest traditions of garden tourism are those of China and Japan. In both countries some temples had famous gardens, and in China a private garden could be visited for a small charge by the 11th century. In India, many Mughal gardens around tombs and mosques could be visited, and throughout the Islamic world some gardens were in effect public parks, open to the public, while others remained strictly private.

In Early Modern Europe it was generally possible for the public, or at least those respectably dressed, to see large parts of royal palace gardens, at least some of the time, while other areas were a "privy garden" with tightly restricted access. At the same time botanic gardens were being founded, which had been visitor attraction as an important part of their function. By the 18th century, the English "garden tour" of large country house gardens was well-established, with guide-books and maps of the garden, and special inns.

Many tourist visits are to gardens, as part of a broader itinerary or a one-off trip, but the amount of tourism dedicated to seeing a series of gardens is much smaller. Garden tourism of this sort remains a niche commercial enterprise. Throughout the world, there are a limited number of boutique tour operators offering guided tours to the public.

== History ==
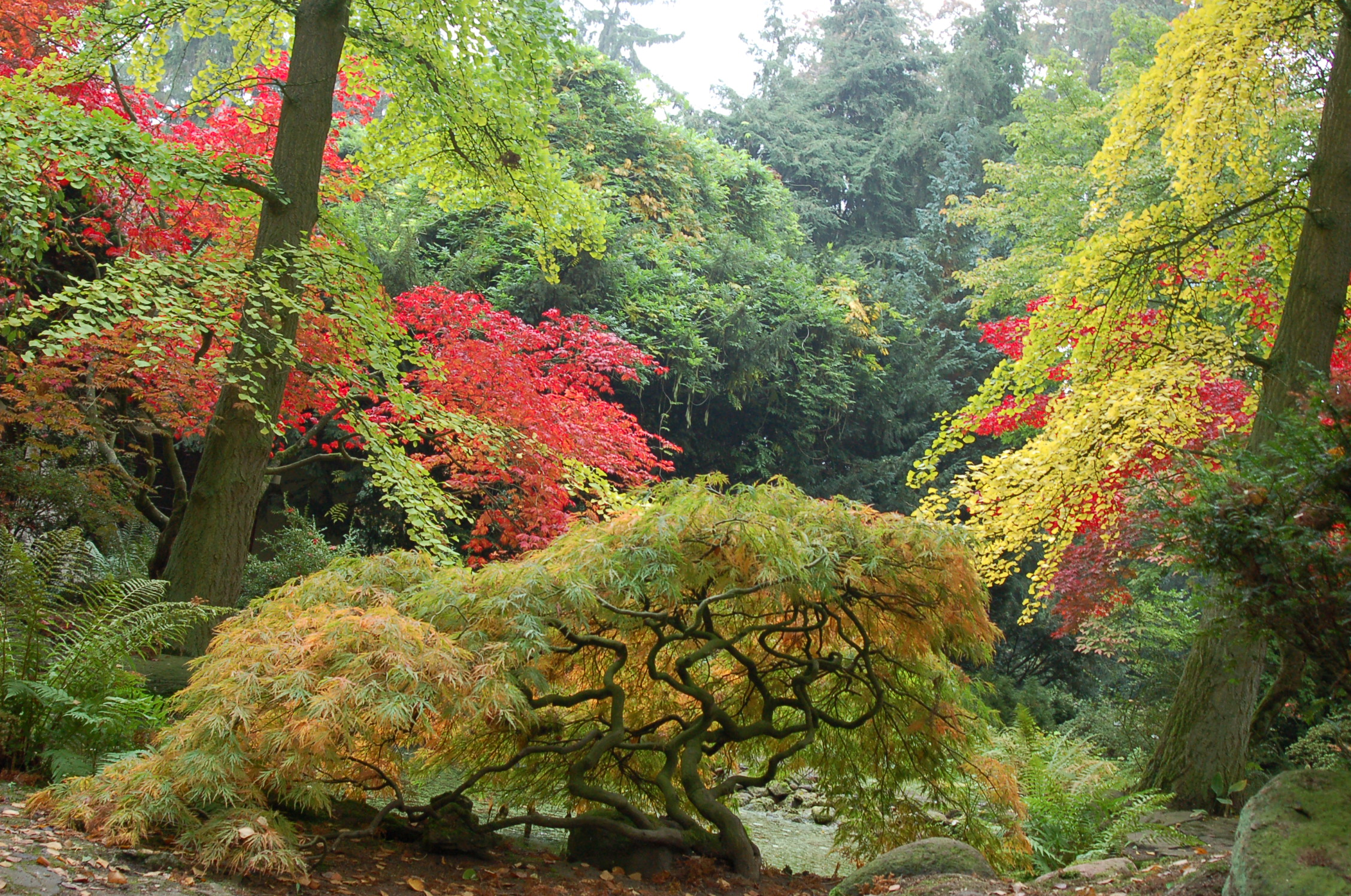
Japanese Garden as a part of Dendrological Garden in Przelewice near Pyrzyce, Poland

Reliable access is necessary for garden tourism. In China, from the Song dynasty onwards, famous private gardens such as the Classical Gardens of Suzhou seem often to have been opened to the public, either for "festivals and holidays", or at certain seasons, or some combination of the two. Payment was sometimes required, if only to keep numbers manageable. The situation with the many enormous Imperial gardens is less clear, but many visitors managed to enter them and record their impressions.

There was probably less access to private Japanese gardens, which tend to run right up to parts of the house, and when first created they seem to have been mostly restricted to visitors from the elite, guests of the owner. But gardens were certainly made to be shown off to visitors; The "stroll garden" with a set walk around it, and recommended stopping points to appreciate the view, is a Japanese feature that later appears in the West. The best Japanese gardens have been continuously and carefully maintained, and probably look more like they did several centuries ago than their equivalents anywhere else in the world. In China large numbers of famous gardens have been restored, probably rather differently from their original appearance. But in India very few older gardens have kept their original appearance.

In Europe the gardens of royal palaces seem to have very often had areas accessible to a wide public, if smartly dressed, while other areas were only accessible to courtiers, or just the royal family and those they invited. Access was likely to be easier when the family were not in residence. The grandest private houses, especially in the country, had similar arrangements; in both cases the owners saw their gardens as expressions of their own status and prestige. The owners of great country houses, especially those distant from the capital, often only visited them for brief periods, typically in the summer, when access might be more restricted.

== Garden tours and literature ==
Michel de Montaigne was one of the earliest garden tourists to record his impressions of gardens (c1580). (Note: The journal of Michel de Montaigne was discovered after his death, and published in 1774 as "Journal de voyage de Michel de Montaigne en Italie, par la Suisse et l'Allemagne en 1580 et 1581". Similar publication followed for example as with the editorship of Alessandro D'Ancona (1835-1914).) John Evelyn also recorded his visits to gardens in France and Italy, as did Fynes Moryson. (Note: Fynes Moryson (or Morison) who visited in 1590s European and Mediterranean regions to publish first three volumes of his journal that he aspired to complete a set of 4 or 5 volumes.) Maggie Campbell-Culver wrote a biography of John Evelyn as she sourced from woods and gardens Evelyn took steps in, and described trees from oak as an Evelyn's symbol to evergreens he favored the most.

== England and Wales: schemes for charity ==
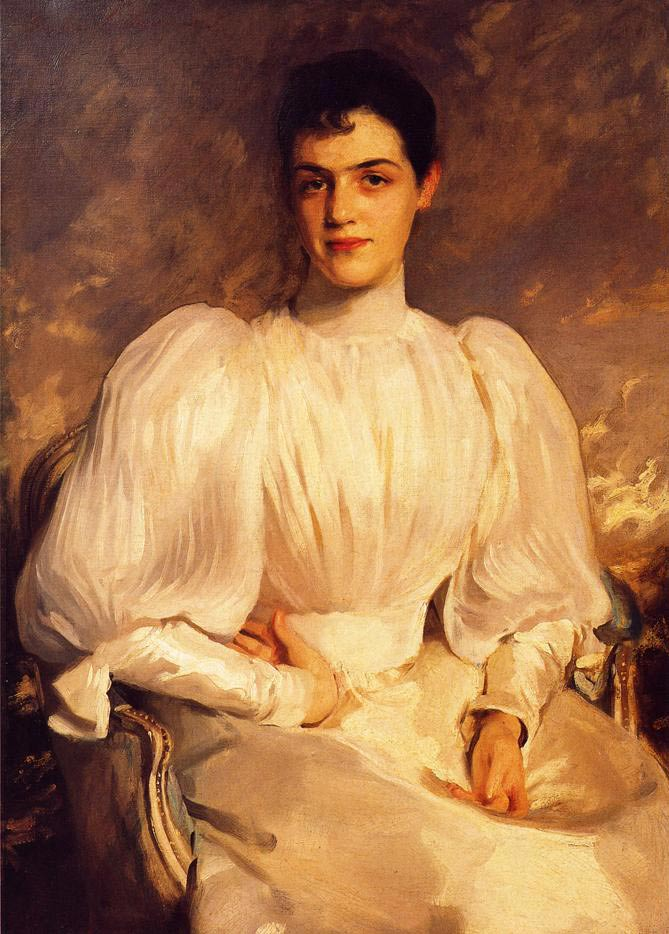
Miss Elsie Wagg, John Singer Sargent, c. 1893

Initially, the garden tour in England and Wales involves private gardens and gardens that does not accept visitors regularly under the National Gardens Scheme, when "Gardens of England and Wales Open for Charity" (the 'Yellow Book') served as a guide book for those seeking to visit gardens in England and Wales. The first issue of the Yellow Book was published as a supplement to a British magazine "Country Life" in 1931, after Elsie Wagg of an institution serving for district nursing came up with the basic idea of National Gardens Scheme, in which a charity and garden tour was combined when gardening was quite popular in the UK.

The movement to open gardens for charity spread to private gardens when it was announced in 1927, and owners of such gardens agreed to collect 1 Shiring fee from each visitors that they donated to the charity. 609 such gardens raised £8,000 and in 1928 the institution renames to The Queen's Institute of District Nursing ("The Queen's Nursing Institute" of later day). With the publication of the first Yellow Book, there were 1,000 gardens to participate in the Scheme, and in 2015 they have donated £4.5 million since 1927. Those owners of private gardens sometimes donated to those charities they choose, amounting to £40,000.

As the garden tour expanded since 1948 when the National Gardens Scheme involved the National Trust: while National Trust offered important gardens for garden tours which they have restored and conserved, and number of visitors increased. The Queen's Institute of District Nursing offered them funds which in turn encouraged the Trust to work on additional garden projects. It was in 2013 when the Yellow Page was officially renamed as "Gardens To Visit".

At the start of the 21st century, with a history of over 100 years of garden tours, Britain had the largest number of gardens open to the public for tourist visits: in 2013, 3,700 gardens are listed in Gardens of England and Wales Open for Charity, when the Yellow 3,500 gardens are listed in Gardens of England and Wales Open for Charity.

== Some much-visited gardens ==
This is a very incomplete list of some representative famous gardens which attract garden tourists from afar:

- Floriade in Australia
- Sissinghurst Castle Garden and Stourhead in England
- Versailles, Giverny, Villandry, Rivau in France
- Keukenhof in the Netherlands
- Mainau Island in Germany
- Villa d'Este and Villa Lante in Italy
- Alhambra in Spain
- Longwood Gardens and Filoli in the US
- Taj Mahal in India
- Ryōan-ji in Japan

== Sources ==
- Batey, Mavis and Lambert, David, The English Garden Tour: A View Into the Past, 1990, John Murray. ISBN 978-0719547751
- "Oxford": The Oxford Companion to Gardens, eds. Geoffrey Jellicoe, Susan Jellicoe, Patrick Goode and Michael Lancaster, 1986, OUP, ISBN 0192861387
