= Margaret Anderson =

Margaret Anderson may refer to:

== People ==
- Margaret Anderson Watts (1832–1905), American social reformer in the temperance movement, writer, and clubwoman
- Margaret Anderson (museum creator) (1834–1910), Scottish museum founder
- Margaret J. Anderson (1859–1930), American hotel owner, businesswoman, and socialite
- Margaret C. Anderson (1886–1973), American editor and publisher
- Margaret Thorn (née Anderson, 1897–1969), New Zealand bookkeeper, political activist and welfare worker
- Margaret Anderson (indexer) (1900–1997), British biochemist and indexer
- Margaret Swainson Anderson (1902–1952), British educator, geographer and cartographer
- Betty Harvie Anderson (Margaret Betty Harvie Anderson, 1913–1979), British politician
- Margaret Irene Anderson (1915–1995), Australian Army nurse
- Margaret Jean Anderson (1915–2003), Canadian businesswoman
- Peggy Anderson (Margaret Joan Anderson, 1938–2016), American reporter and author
- Margaret L. Anderson (born 1941), American professor
- Margaret Anderson (1948–1983), Wisconsin woman murdered in 1983, see murder of Margaret Anderson
- Margaret Dawn Anderson (born 1967), Canadian civil servant and politician
- Margaret Anderson Kelliher (born 1968), American politician
- Margaret A. Anderson, executive director of FasterCures

== Other ==
- USS Margaret Anderson (SP-1203), a U.S. Navy patrol boat during World War I
- Margaret Anderson, a character in Father Knows Best

== See also ==
- Maggie Anderson (disambiguation)
