= Yuanta Securities =

Taiwanese financial services company

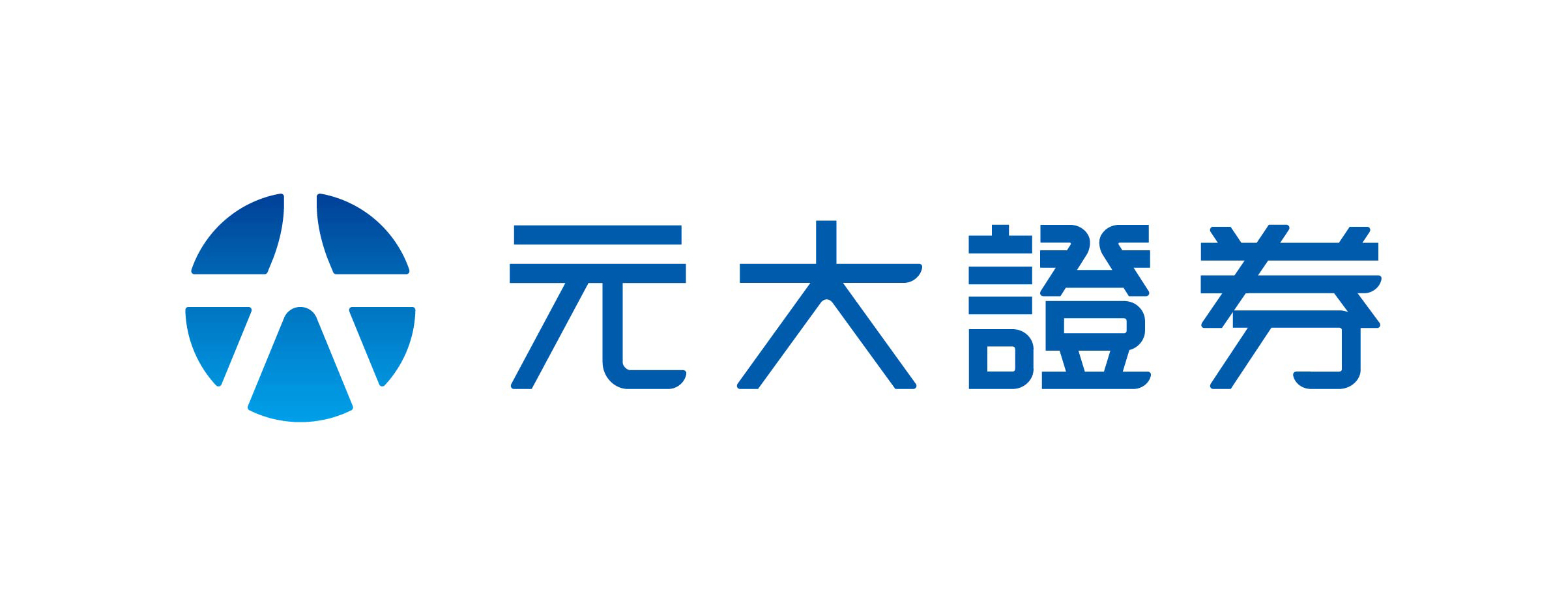
- Company type: Subsidiary
- Industry: Investment Services
- Founded: 1996; 30 years ago
- Headquarters: Taipei City, Taiwan
- Products: Financial services Investment banking
- Revenue: ▲NT$ 41.12 billion (12/31/18)
- Operating income: ▲NT$ 10.18 billion (12/31/18)
- Net income: ▲NT$ 10.08 billion (12/31/18)
- Parent: Yuanta Financial Holding Co., Ltd. (100.00%)
- Website: 元大證券

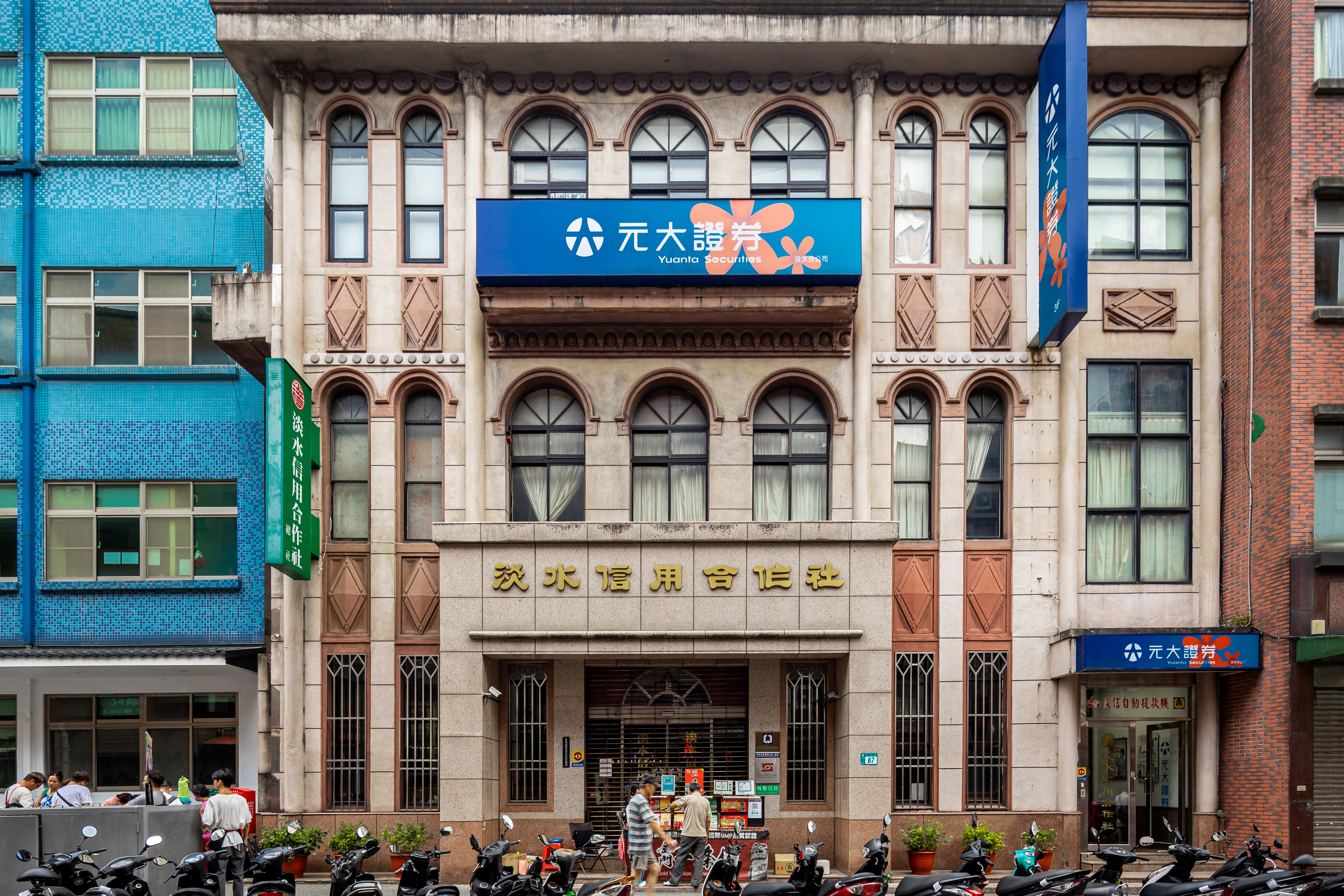
Yuanta Securities, Tamsui Branch in 2023

Yuanta Securities is a Taiwanese financial services company headquartered in Taipei, Taiwan, and is a subsidiary of Yuanta Financial Holdings. The firm provides clients with capital markets and financial advisory services, institutional brokerage and securities research.

Currently Yuanta Securities is the largest brokerage house in Taiwan, with about 12% of market share in the Taiwanese stock market.

== History ==
The predecessors of Yuanta Securities include Yuanta Securities established in 1961, Core Pacific Securities and Polaris Securities established in 1988, and Fuhua Securities established in 1996. In 2000, Yuanta Securities and Core Pacific Securities merged into Yuanta Core Pacific Securities; in 2007, Yuanta Core Pacific Securities and Fuhua Securities were merged into Yuanta Securities; in 2012, Yuanta Securities and Polaris securities were merged into Yuanta Polaris Securities; in 2015, Yuanta Polaris Securities was renamed Yuanta Securities.

Yuanta Securities is now dominated by Yuanda Financial Holdings, after many mergers, while Fuhua Securities is the surviving company.

== Controversies ==
A board member of Yuanta Financial Holdings resigned in 2012 after his son, Justin Lee, was found to have drugged and raped many women.
