= Fairview, West Virginia =

- Town
- Location of Fairview in Marion County, West Virginia.
- Coordinates: 39°35′34″N 80°14′50″W
- Country: United States
- State: West Virginia
- County: Marion

Area
  - Total: 0.28 sq mi (0.72 km^{2})
  - Land: 0.28 sq mi (0.72 km^{2})
  - Water: 0 sq mi (0.00 km^{2})
- Elevation: 1,001 ft (305 m)

Population (2020)
  - Total: 373
  - Estimate (2021): 373
  - Density: 1,444/sq mi (557.7/km^{2})
- Time zone: UTC-5 (Eastern (EST))
  - Summer (DST): UTC-4 (EDT)
- ZIP code: 26570
- Area code: 304
- FIPS code: 54-26524
- GNIS feature ID: 1538797

Fairview is a town in Marion County, West Virginia, United States. The population was 374 at the 2020 census.

The town took its name from the old Fairview Inn near the original town site.

== Geography ==
Fairview is located at 39°35′34″N 80°14′50″W (39.592698, -80.247124).

According to the United States Census Bureau, the town has a total area of 0.28 square miles (0.73 km^{2}), all land.

== Demographics ==
Historical population
Census	Pop.	Note	%±
1860	69		—
1870	72		4.3%
1880	195		170.8%
1890	235		20.5%
1910	782		—
1920	827		5.8%
1930	836		1.1%
1940	831		−0.6%
1950	775		−6.7%
1960	653		−15.7%
1970	640		−2.0%
1980	759		18.6%
1990	513		−32.4%
2000	435		−15.2%
2010	408		−6.2%
2020	373		−8.6%
2021 (est.)	373	Steady	0.0%
U.S. Decennial Census

=== 2010 census ===
At the 2010 census there were 408 people, 173 households, and 117 families living in the town. The population density was 1,457.1 inhabitants per square mile (562.6/km^{2}). There were 199 housing units at an average density of 710.7 per square mile (274.4/km^{2}). The racial makeup of the town was 98.8% White, 0.2% Native American, and 1.0% from two or more races. Hispanic or Latino of any race were 0.2%.

Of the 173 households 26.6% had children under the age of 18 living with them, 47.4% were married couples living together, 11.6% had a female householder with no husband present, 8.7% had a male householder with no wife present, and 32.4% were non-families. 28.9% of households were one person and 16.2% were one person aged 65 or older. The average household size was 2.36 and the average family size was 2.85.

The median age in the town was 45.9 years. 21.1% of residents were under the age of 18; 5.6% were between the ages of 18 and 24; 21.8% were from 25 to 44; 27.7% were from 45 to 64; and 23.8% were 65 or older. The gender makeup of the town was 48.3% male and 51.7% female.

=== 2000 census ===
At the 2000 census there were 435 people, 186 households, and 125 families living in the town. The population density was 1,537.5 inhabitants per square mile (599.8/km^{2}). There were 225 housing units at an average density of 795.3 per square mile (310.3/km^{2}). The racial makeup of the town was 99.54% White, and 0.46% from two or more races. Hispanic or Latino of any race were 0.69%.

Of the 186 households 27.4% had children under the age of 18 living with them, 50.5% were married couples living together, 14.0% had a female householder with no husband present, and 32.3% were non-families. 30.1% of households were one person and 19.4% were one person aged 65 or older. The average household size was 2.34 and the average family size was 2.87.

The age distribution was 23.7% under the age of 18, 6.9% from 18 to 24, 21.4% from 25 to 44, 26.9% from 45 to 64, and 21.1% 65 or older. The median age was 43 years. For every 100 females, there were 79.0 males. For every 100 females age 18 and over, there were 73.8 males.

The median household income was $24,896 and the median family income was $32,679. Males had a median income of $26,607 versus $14,375 for females. The per capita income for the town was $14,106. About 14.8% of families and 16.7% of the population were below the poverty line, including 31.5% of those under age 18 and 5.0% of those age 65 or over.

== Notable people ==
- Maggie McCurdy, sculptor
- Jay Johnson Morrow, Brigadier general who served during World War I and later Governor of the Panama Canal Zone
- Fielding H. Yost, football coach

== See also ==
- List of towns in West Virginia
