= Wu (surname 武) =

Wǔ is a Chinese surname. It is pronounced Mo in Cantonese. In Vietnamese is written Vũ or Võ. As a Chinese word, it carries the meanings "martial", "military", "martial arts".

== Origins ==
- from Wu Luo (武羅), said to be either the name of a prehistoric state in present-day Guangxi or of an official of the prehistoric Xia dynasty
- from the posthumous title of Duke Wu of Song (r. 765–748 BCE), Spring and Autumn period ruler of Song, in present-day Shangqiu, Henan
- from the posthumous name of Wu Ding king of the Shang dynasty c. 1200 BCE
- from the personal name of a son of King Ping of Zhou, first king of the Eastern Zhou dynasty

== Notable people ==
- Wu Zetian (武則天 (Note: Acquired surname: Wu Zetian's surname at birth is unknown.); 624–705), the only Empress Regnant in China's history
- Wu Chengsi (武承嗣; d. 698), Prince Xuan of Wei (魏宣王), nephew of Wu Zetian
- Wu Youji (武攸暨; d. 712), Prince Zhongjian of Ding (定忠簡王), husband of Princess Taiping
- Wu Song (武松), legendary hero from the Chinese classic novel Outlaws of the Marsh
- Maggie Wu (武卫; born 1969), Chinese business executive and Chief Financial Officer of Alibaba Group
- Wu Yuxiang (武禹襄; 1812–1880), tai chi teacher and government official active during the late Qing dynasty
- Wu Changshun (武长顺; born 1954), former police chief of the municipality of Tianjin, China
- Wu Dawei (武大伟; born 1946), former special representative for Korean Peninsula Affairs and former Vice-Minister of Foreign Affairs of the People's Republic of China
- Wu Lei (武磊; born 1991), Chinese footballer
- Wu Weihua (武维华; born 1956), chair of the Jiusan Society, a minority party in the People's Republic of China
- Wu Yi (武艺; born 1990), also known as Philip Wu and Philip Lau, Chinese pop singer
