= Game of Hunting =

2017 Chinese television series

- Promotional poster
- Also known as: Five men in suits
- Genre: Workplace; Drama
- Written by: Jiang Wei
- Directed by: Jiang Wei
- Starring: Hu Ge
- Country of origin: China
- Original language: Mandarin
- No. of seasons: 1
- No. of episodes: 52

Production
- Producer: Zhang Jing
- Production locations: Zhejiang, Yunnan
- Running time: 45 minutes
- Production companies: Dream Sky Entertainment; Zhejiang Film & Television Group

Original release
- Network: Hunan TV
- Release: 6 November – 9 December 2017

Game of Hunting (Chinese: 猎场) is a 2017 Chinese television series directed and written by Jiang Wei, which focuses on the occupation of Headhunters. It stars Hu Ge as the protagonist. The series aired on Hunan TV from 6 November to 9 December 2017.

== Synopsis ==
The premise follows persistent man Zheng Qiudong in the finance world as he navigates through business failures, economic pitfalls purposely set up by adversaries and unfortunate romances without losing his moral principles to become an elite of the financial world, described metaphorically as the “hunting ground”. After an unfortunate event, Zheng Qiudong's business falls apart and he has to start over from the beginning with the help of new alliances.

== Cast ==
- Hu Ge as Zheng Qiudong
  - An ordinary but ambitious and persistent man, who fell into a slump in both his career and love life.
- Jian Renzi as Luo Yiren
  - Zheng Qiudong's first girlfriend who stayed by his side and encouraged him.
- Chen Long as Lin Bai
  - Zheng Qiudong's mentor in the finance industry, and good friend.
- Sun Honglei as Liu Liangti
  - Zheng Qiudong's prison comrade and his mentor in life.
- Zhang Jiayi as Qu Fujing
  - The first major client of Zheng Qiudong.
- Zu Feng as Bai Liqin
  - Zheng Qiudong's university best friend and later rival, who becomes involved in Zheng Qiudong and Luo Yiren's relationship.
- Li Qiang as Yuan Kun
  - Zheng Qiudong's rival in work. A crafty man who would resort to underhanded means to achieve his goal.
- Hu Bing as Chen Xiufeng
  - A capable finance executive, who is one of Zheng Qiudong's prime target.
- Wan Qian as Xiong Qingchun
  - A composed, quick-thinking and capable businesswoman. She is Zheng Qiudong's best right-hand woman at work and later becomes his second girlfriend.
- Zhang Lingzhi as Jia Yimei
  - Zheng Qiudong's third girlfriend.
- Dong Yong as Yuan Tao
  - A policeman.
- Li Naiwen as Chen Xiang
  - A mysterious businessman.
- Du Jiang as Kai Wenyang
- Zhao Lixin as Yu Fangzhi
- Xu Ge as Hui Chenggong
  - Zheng Qiudong's subordinate.
- Maggie Qin as Ma Xiaohong
  - Zheng Qiudong's subordinate.
- Ke Lan as Gui Huang
- Luo Haiqiong as Jian Na
- Wang Qian as Hai Shan
- Ma Yuan as Yu Chengfei
- Zhang Ziyan as Qu Yunfeng
  - Qu Fujing's daughter.
- Jiang Shan as Zhou Shuanghe
- Yuan Ran as Feng Juanjuan
- Xu Xiaofeng as Mi Na
- Wang Lejun as Tao Huamei
- Zhou Fang as Zhou Zhunlan
- Zhu Jie as Tan Fei
- Zhou Chengqi

== Production ==
- The script was named one of the Outstanding Scripts in 2015 by SARFT.
- The series is directed and written by Jiang Wei, who has worked on several critically acclaimed television series like Lurk and Borrow Gun.

== Soundtrack ==
Game of Hunting Original Soundtrack
No.	Title	Singer	Length
1.	"Bloom (盛開)" (Ending theme song)	Hu Ge
2.	"A Relationship (一場戀愛)"	Aska Yang
3.	"Scarborough Fair"	Egide

== Ratings ==
- Highest ratings are marked in red, lowest ratings are marked in blue

Hunan Satellite TV CSM52 City ratings
Air date	Episode	Ratings (%)	Ratings share (%)	Rank
2017.11.6	1-2	0.549	1.93	6
2017.11.7	3-4	0.608	2.09	5
2017.11.8	5-6	0.666	2.31	5
2017.11.9	7-8	0.766	2.63	3
2017.11.10	9	0.667	2.16	3
2017.11.11	10	0.741	2.47	4
2017.11.12	11-12	0.718	2.31	4
2017.11.13	13-14	0.729	2.49	5
2017.11.14	15-16	0.866	2.98	4
2017.11.15	17-18	0.875	3.04	3
2017.11.16	19-20	0.895	3.1	3
2017.11.17	21	0.767	2.48	4
2017.11.18	22	0.873	2.77	3
2017.11.19	23-24	0.788	2.48	4
2017.11.20	25-26	0.911	3.18	4
2017.11.21	27-28	1.13	3.89	3
2017.11.22	29-30	1.02	3.56	2
2017.11.23	31-32	1.056	3.68	1
2017.11.24	33	0.67	2.2	5
2017.11.25	34	0.869	2.86	4
2017.11.26	35-36	0.967	3.1	3
2017.11.27	37-38	1.068	3.75	2
2017.11.28	39-40	1.168	4.1	2
2017.11.29	41-42	1.122	3.86	2
2017.11.30	43-44	1.108	3.81	3
2017.12.1	45	0.788	2.57	4
2017.12.2	46	0.842	2.72	4
2017.12.3	47-48	0.9	2.9	4
2017.12.4	49-50	1.223	4.22	3
2017.12.5	51-52	1.153	3.92	3
2017.12.6	53-54	1.333	4.66	3
2017.12.7	55-56	1.154	4.04	3
2017.12.8	57	0.832	2.73	4
2017.12.9	58	1.053	3.46	3
Average ratings		0.917	3.11	-

== Awards and nominations ==
Year	Award	Category	Nominated work	Result	Ref.
2017	8th Macau International Television Festival	Best Director	Jiang Wei	Nominated	
2017	8th Macau International Television Festival	Best Supporting Actor	Sun Honglei	Nominated	
2018	24th Shanghai Television Festival	Best Actor	Hu Ge	Nominated	
2018	24th Shanghai Television Festival	Best Supporting Actress	Wan Qian	Nominated	
2018	24th Huading Awards	Best Supporting Actress	Wan Qian	Nominated	
2018	24th Huading Awards	Best Producer	Zhang Jing	Nominated	
