= Kilmoulis =

British folkloric creature

A kilmoulis is, in the folklore of the Anglo-Scottish border, an ugly version of the brownie who is said to haunt mills. He has an enormous nose and no mouth. This lack of an orifice forces him to inhale his food through his nose. The Kilmoulis works hard for the miller, but also delights in tricks and pranks. While his pranks may be a hindrance, he is generally enough help to offset the food he eats and the disturbances he causes.

In popular culture, it has been used in the Dungeons & Dragons game as a fey creature. A version of the kilmoulis appears in the video game Folklore. Kilmoulis also appears as a sentient monster in Andrzej Sapkowski's Witcher books.

== See also ==
- Brownie—Scottish and English folk tradition
- Fenodyree—Manx legends
- Domovoy—Slavic domestic belief
- Hobgoblin—British folklore
- Nixie—Germanic and Nordic mythology

== Sources ==
- Faeries - ISBN 0-8109-0901-4 (H.C), Copyright 1978 Rufus Publications, Inc. Published in 1978 by Harry N. Abrams, Inc, New York.
- Killmoulis
- Killmoulis
