= Margaret Anderson (museum creator) =

Museum founder

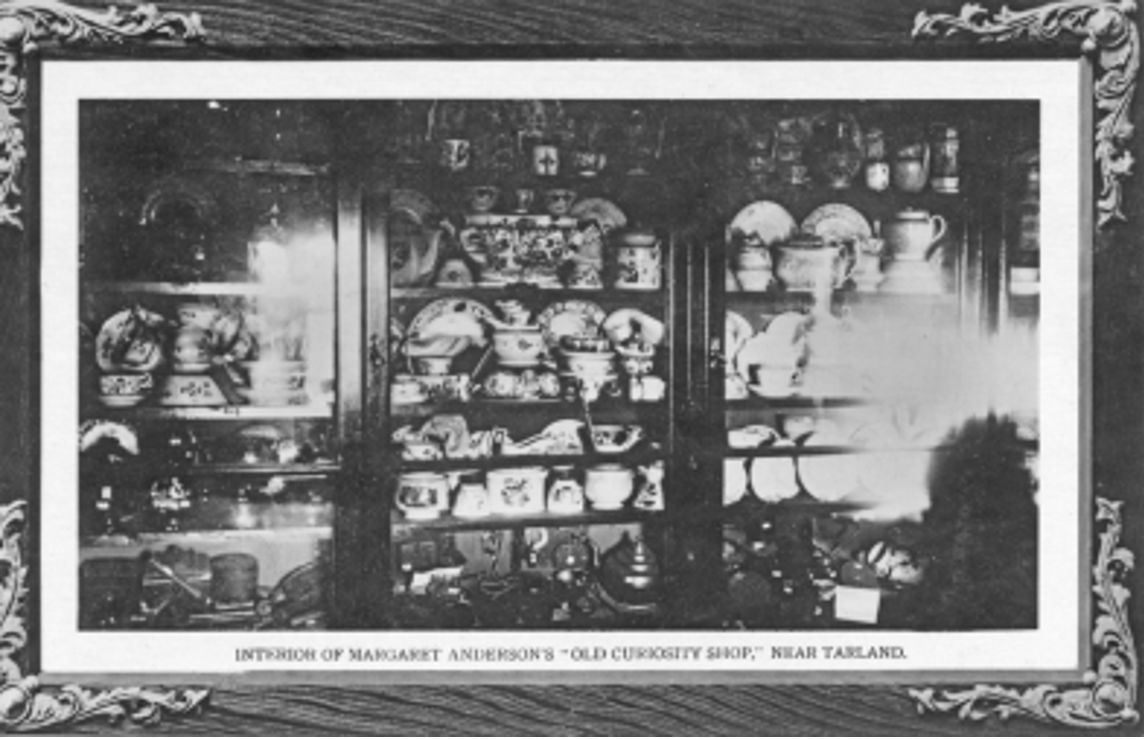
1929 postcard of Margaret Anderson's museum in Scotland

Margaret Anderson, (14 December 1834 – 2 October 1910) was an early Scottish museum founder. She is known for her roadside museum in Buchan, Scotland.

== Life ==
Margaret was born on December 14, 1834, in Tarland, Scotland, to Elspet Grant and Robert Anderson . Margaret's work life started at the age of seven, when her education ended upon being employed to herd sheep. Her other occupations included working in harvest, in domestic service, and at a primary school. Later, due to her parents' ill health, she stepped in to oversee the family croft. This was in spite of many health challenges of her own. Though her education was cut short, Margaret's curiosity was not. At a young age, she had begun to collect items, which would later be displayed at her museum. These items included shells, old agricultural and household items, and unique stones. She received donations from friends as well, including animal skins from their travels.

Margaret left her museum in the care of Lord and Lady Aberdeen, who set it up in a physical structure in Tarland. After the start of World War I, however, the museum was shut down because it was needed for use during the war.
