= Maggie Wu (actress) =

Taiwanese model and actress

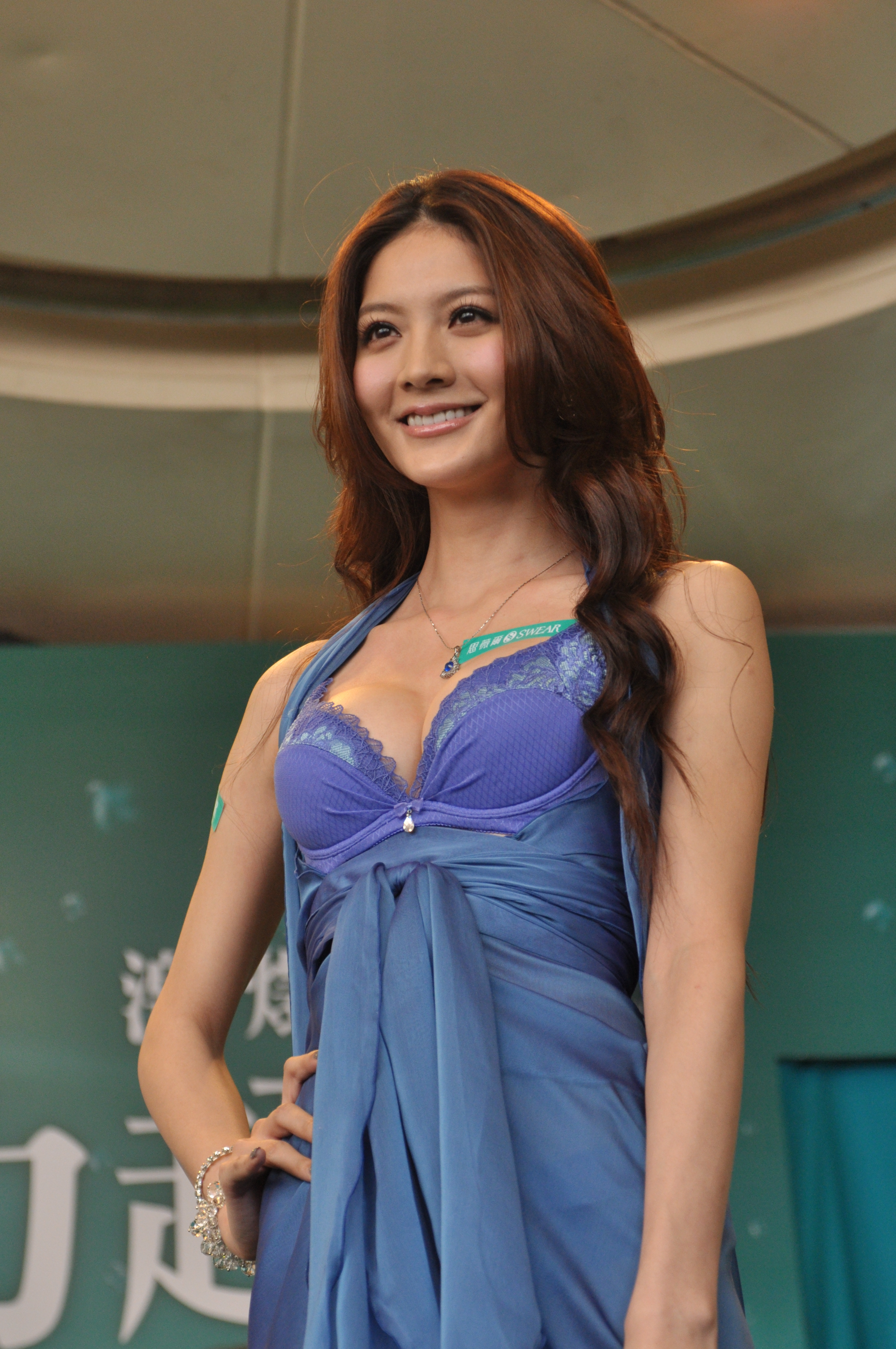
- Born: Wu Ya-hsin; 8 October 1983 (age 43); Taipei, Taiwan
- Occupations: Actress, Model
- Years active: 2006-present

Maggie Wu
- Traditional Chinese: 吳亞馨
- Simplified Chinese: 吴亚馨
Transcriptions
Standard Mandarin
- Hanyu Pinyin: Wú Yàxīn
Hakka
- Romanization: Wu Ya-hsin

Maggie Wu (born Wu Ya-hsin, 8 October 1983) is a Taiwanese model and actress. Her breakthrough was starring alongside the singer in the music video for Peter Ho's 2008 "I Only Care for You". She has since been a cover girl for GQ Taiwan (in 2009) and for FHM Taiwan (in 2009 and in 2011). She has also acted in other music videos and has appeared in several television roles.

Maggie Wu was one of the victims of socialite serial sex offender Justin Lee.
