= Maggie Anderson (disambiguation) =

Maggie Anderson (born 1948), is an American poet.

Maggie Anderson may also refer to:

== People ==
- Maggie Anderson (activist) (born 1971), American advocate of buying from businesses owned by African Americans

== Fictional characters ==
- Maggie Anderson, character in the musical play Brigadoon
- Maggie Anderson, character in the film The Day of the Wolves
- Maggie Anderson, minor character in Read or Die series of novels

== See also ==
- Margaret Anderson (disambiguation)
