= Maggie Anwer =

Egyptian-Italian director, producer and writer

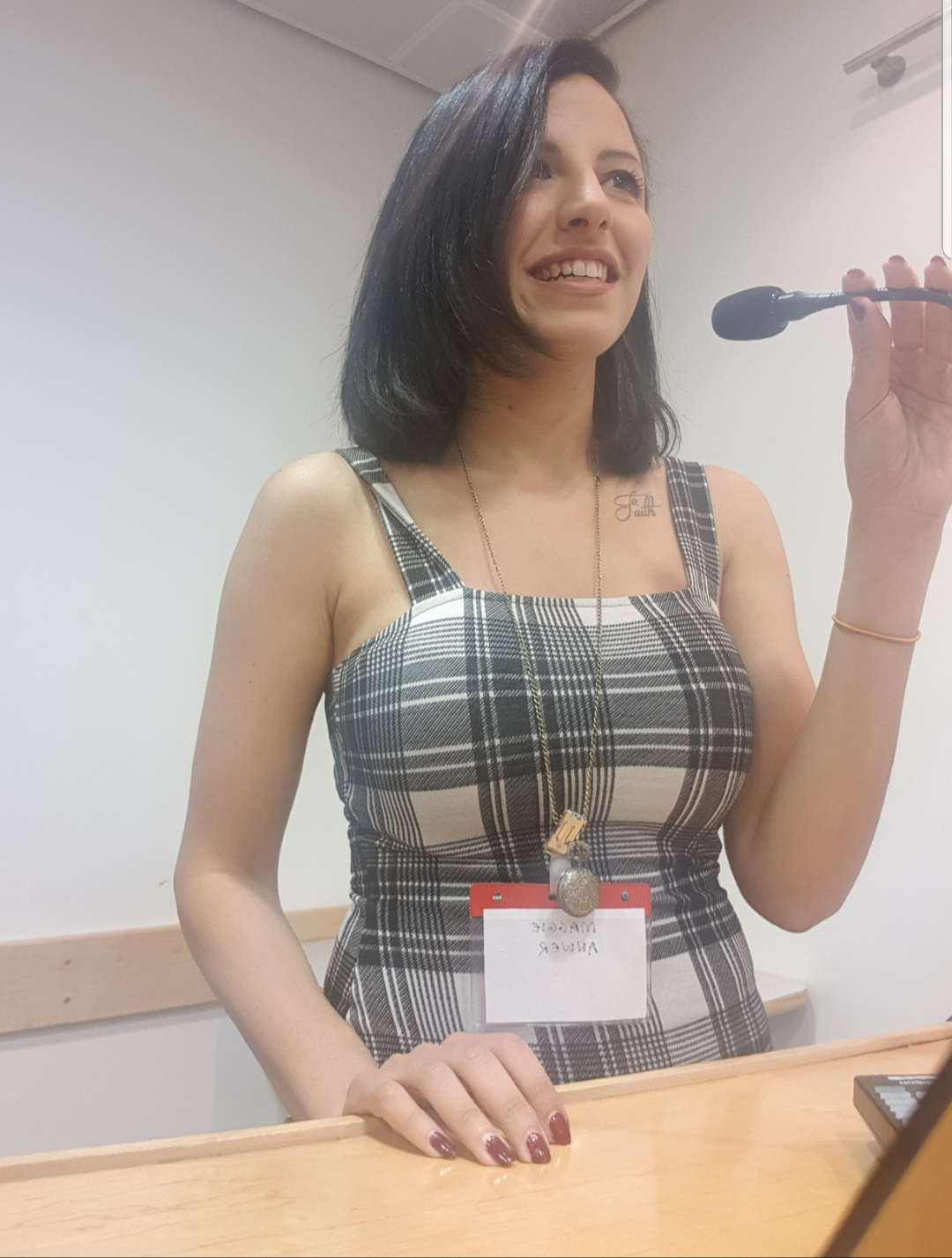
- Born: ماجي أنور; Egypt
- Occupations: Film director, distributor, filmmaker

Maggie Anwer (Arabic: ماجي أنور) is an Egyptian-Italian director, producer, and writer. She is the founder of Faten Hamama Film Festival and is best known for directing several documentary films that reflect the career of many artists such as Al Fatenah a film about the late Faten Hamama.

== Biography ==
=== Education ===
Anwer graduated from the Faculty of Mass Communication, Radio and Television Department. She started her career at the age of sixteen when she participated in writing articles about English movies on the extranet pages of youth newspapers and film websites. In addition, she received a degree from Harvard University for William Shakespeare's Merchant Of Venice. In 2008, after her graduation, she participated in preparing television programs including Ashraf Abdel Baqi's Darak.

=== Career ===
In 2015, she founded, in cooperation with the late artist Faten Hamama, the Faten Hamama Film Festival, which is currently held in London. The festival includes three categories including feature films, short films, and drawings. In 2013, Anwer held a workshop to teach ladies how to make a film in Saudi Arabia as well as she participated in directing the play of Mali Sewak which is the first women's play for Rwaq Almadina in Saudi Arabia.

Anwer participates as a jury in several international film festivals, she is the first director that participated as a jury in four European film festivals such as the London Film Festival, the Nice International Film Festival in France in 2019, and the Madrid International Film Festival at its eighth session in 2020.

== Works ==
During her career, she made documentary films that explored the career of several celebrities. In 2015, She made Al Fatenah, a film about the late Faten Hamama, the film shows the last message of Faten Hamama to the audience before her death. She also made Al Muntamy, a film about the Syrian comedian and director Duraid Lahham, the film explores the art events in his life. In 2016, she directed Al Gamil, a 28-minute film about the career of the late Egyptian actor Gamil Ratib. In the same year, she directed the Abu Simbel film, she made it in Egypt and Italy which helped in saving Abu Simbel temples. Anwer wrote and directed The Distributor, a film that explores the distribution of the foreign films of Warner Bros. and Fox during fifty years in Egypt, and explores the life of Antwan Zend, the film distributor and she was a co-producer with the Egyptian actor Hisham Selim. In the same year, she wrote and produced Barcodia starring Shadi Al Dali, the film is about a virtual world with a device that reveals the facts in front of everyone and mainly used to choose the life partner. In 2019, she asked the Egyptian artist Farida Fahmy, the wife of the late director and founder of Reda Troupe Ali Reda, to help her to provide the film footage for her short documentary film that explores the life of the director Ali Reda.

== Filmography ==
- Al Fatenah
- Al Muntamy
- Al Gamil
- Abu Simbel
- The Distributor
- Barcodia
