= Maggie Rae =

British sociologist

Margaret Mary Rae CBE is a British public health specialist, Professor, President of the Epidemiology and Public Health section of the Royal Society of Medicine and Ex President of the Faculty of Public Health. She leads the South West Academy of Population and Public Health for Health Education England.

== Research and career ==
Professor Maggie Rae is interested in health inequality, sustainable development and standards in public health. She worked as Corporate Director and Director of Public Health for Wiltshire Council

As President of the Faculty of Public Health Rae worked on improving access to community pharmacies, which she believed would reduce health inequalities. She led the United Kingdom through the COVID-19 pandemic, and worked to improve global access to vaccines. In 2020 the UK Government decided to overhaul Public Health England, and spent a transferring the health protection functions to the UK Health Security Agency. She argued that funding should be directed toward public health interventions led by local authorities, and that provision should be joined up nationally to improve public health and avoid silos.

Rae was made President of the RSM Epidemiology and Public Health Section in 2022. She runs public health training for South West England. She was made a trustee of the Royal Society for Public Health. She was part of the team appointed to lead an independent review of Jersey's response to the COVID-19 pandemic.

She was appointed a Commander of the Order of British Empire (CBE) in the 2024 New Year Honours, for services to Public Health and to Public Health Standards.

== Select publications ==
- Victor Adebowale; Derek Alderson; Wendy Burn; et al. (23 June 2020). "Covid-19: Call for a rapid forward looking review of the UK's preparedness for a second wave-an open letter to the leaders of all UK political parties". The BMJ. 369: m2514. doi:10.1136/BMJ.M2514. ISSN 0959-8138. PMID 32576551. Wikidata Q96639117.
- Charlotte Bigland; David Evans; Richard Bolden; Maggie Rae (17 November 2020). "Systems leadership in practice: thematic insights from three public health case studies". BMC Public Health. 20 (1): 1735. doi:10.1186/S12889-020-09641-1. ISSN 1471-2458. PMC 7673088. PMID 33203397. Wikidata Q102140083.
- May C I van Schalkwyk; Pepita Barlow; David Stuckler; Maggie Rae; Tim Lang; Tamara Hervey; Martin McKee (29 August 2019). "Assessing the health effects of a "no deal" Brexit". The BMJ. 366: l5300. doi:10.1136/BMJ.L5300. ISSN 0959-8138. PMID 31466943. Wikidata Q92991966.
