= Maggie Qin =

Chinese actress and model

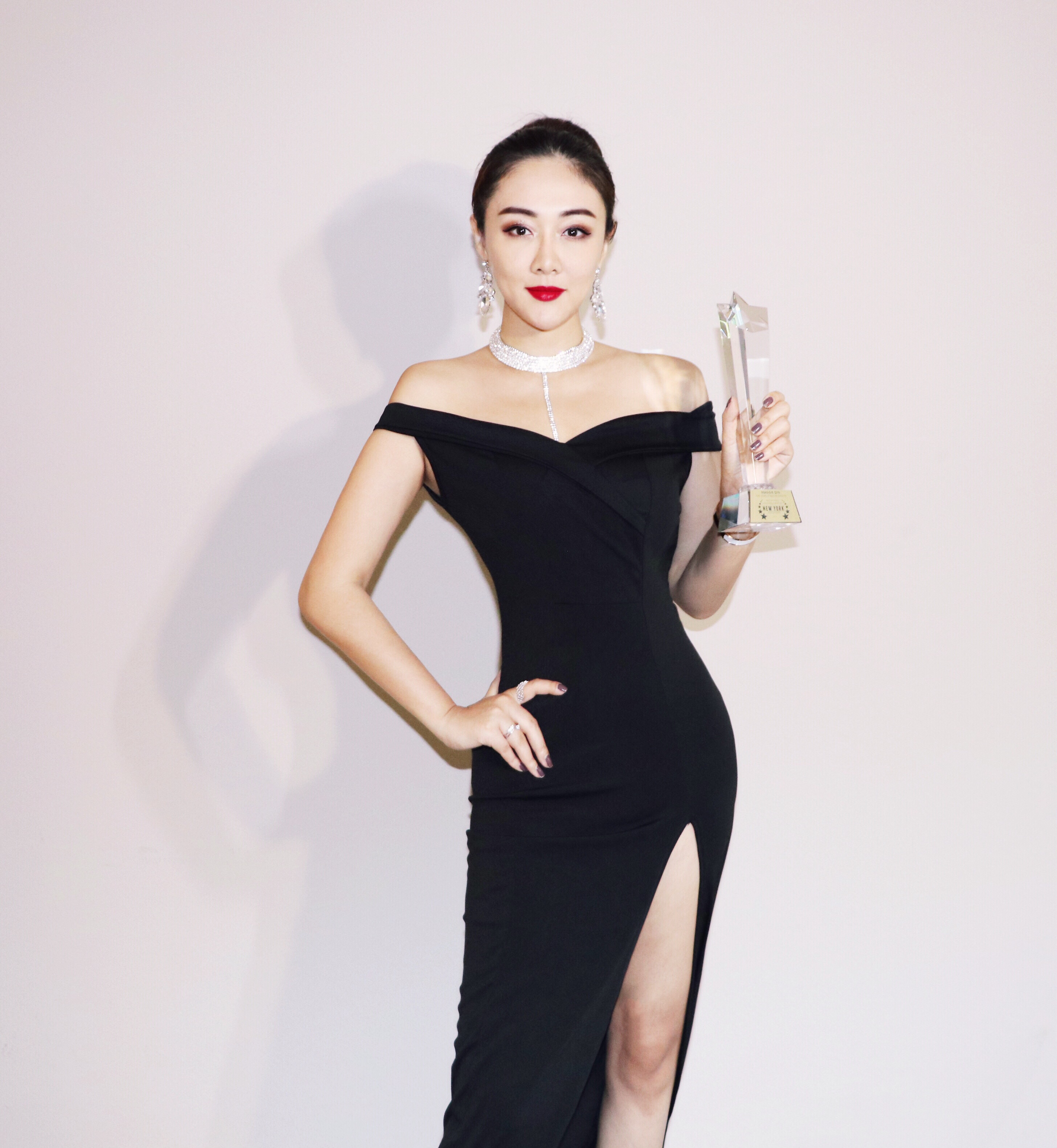
- Born: March 27, 1989 (age 37)
- Education: UBC; NYFA
- Occupations: Actress; Host; Model
- Years active: 2008–current
- Website: www.weibo.com/u/2964424721

Maggie Qin (Chinese: 秦雅思) is a Chinese actress, model, and TV show host.

Maggie Qin graduated in Real Property Assessment from the University of British Columbia. Maggie was named the Sunshine Girl for Toronto SUN newspaper in 2008 and appeared on the covers of Charm Season Magazine, New York VNB Magazine, Expos Yourself Fashion and Beauty Magazine. She became the TV show host for Canada National TV and went on to host TV episodes of Entertainment High 5 and Eating in Toronto. In 2014, Maggie hosted the American travel show, Joy In America for ICN International TV in New York.

== Career ==
After starring in her first leading role in the short film, Flushing Flesh (2015) which she was nominated for Best Actress in Hollywood Dreamz Film Festival, Qin made her acting career her primary focus. She went to China and starred in a variety of film and TV shows, such as the feature film Young Dream (2016) for which she won 'Best Actress' in The 2nd China Teenagers Film Festival and was nominated in the 2nd Silk Road International Film Festival. The Love of Bachelorette (2018), for which she won 'Best Actress' at Actors Awards, Hollywood Dreamz Film Festival, Action on Film Festival, Festigious Film Festival. Honorable Mention: Best Actress in New York Film Awards, Award of Merit: Leading Actress in Accolade Global Film Competition.

She also starred in Qian Tu (2016) and Chuang Zhi Ling Yun (2016). She co-starred in Startup Career (2016), The Doctor Monkey Ninja's Ambition (2015), The Iron Monkey (2015). She also played major roles on famous TV series and dramas: Game of Hunting (2016), Ode to Joy (2017), Da Ran Fang II (2016), Wuxin: The Monster Killer (2015), Shi Ling Lu (2016), Chi Shui He (2015). As a popular actress in China, she was invited as the guest Judge and co-host for the singing competition show Up Idol. Maggie also hosted the show of Brands for CCTV as well as hosting the First Business Conferences of Changzhou, Jiang Su and the 2nd China Teenagers Film Festival.

== Awards and nominations ==
Action on Film International Film Festival - Best Actress

Hollywood Dreamz International Film Festival - Best Actress

Accolade Global Film Competition - Award of Merit: Leading Actress

Los Angeles Film Awards - Best Actress

Festigious International Film Festival - Best Actress

New York Film Awards - Honorable Mention: Actress

Actor Awards Los Angeles-Best Actress

The 14th Changchun Film Festival · China（Screening）

The 2nd China Teenagers Film Festival – Best Actress

Nominated The 2nd Silk Road International Film Festival

== Filmography ==
=== Film ===
| Year | Title | Role |
|---|---|---|
| 2014 | Flushing Flesh | Amy |
| 2015 | Doctor Monkey Battles the Werewolf | Amemiya Youruo |
| 2015 | The Doctor Monkey Ninja's Ambition | RuoYou |
| 2015 | The Iron Monkey | Liu Shulan |
| 2015 | Killing Town | Jessy Li |
| 2016 | Young Dream | Qian Fang |
| 2016 | Startup Career | Nana |
| 2016 | The Hapless Killer | Li Yueyao |
| 2018 | The Love of Bachelorette | Ying Xiao Le |
| 2018 | A Million Dollar Delivery Guy | Anna |

=== Television series ===
| Year | Title | Role |
|---|---|---|
| 2015 | Da Ran Fang | Ying Zi |
| 2015 | Wuxin: The Monster Killer | Gu Tai |
| 2016 | Shi Ling Lu | He Xiao Man |
| 2017 | Game of Hunting | Ma Xiao Hong |
| 2017 | Ode to Joy | Li Min |

=== Awards and nominations ===
| Year | Award | Category | Nominated work | Result |
|---|---|---|---|---|
| 2014 | Boston Underground Film Festival | | Flushing Flesh | Official Selection |
| 2016 | China Television Actor Association | Best Actress | | Won |
| 2016 | China Teenagers Film Festival | Best Actress | Young Dream | Won |
| 2016 | Silk Road international Film Festival | | Young Dream | Nominated |
| 2018 | Action on Film International Film Festival | Best Actress | The Love of Bachelorette | Won |
| 2018 | Hollywood Dreamz International Film Festival | Best Actress | The Love of Bachelorette | Won |
| 2018 | Hollywood Dreamz International Film Festival | Best Actress -Short | Flushing Flesh | Nominated |
| 2018 | Los Angeles Film Awards | Best Actress | The Love of Bachelorette | Won |
| 2018 | Actors Awards | Best Actress | The Love of Bachelorette | Won |
| 2018 | Festigious International Film Festival | Best Actress | The Love of Bachelorette | Won |
| 2018 | New York Film Awards | Honorable Mention: Actress | The Love of Bachelorette | Won |
| 2018 | Accolade Global Film Competition | Award of Merit: Leading Actress | The Love of Bachelorette | Won |
| 2018 | Changchun Film Festival | | The Love of Bachelorette | Screening |
