= Maggie McCurdy =

American sculptor (born 1932)

Maggie McCurdy (born 1932) is an American sculptor.

McCurdy is a native of Fairview, West Virginia. She earned a bachelor's degree from West Virginia University in 1954 and attended the Yale School of Art. She is a sculptor, both post-war and contemporary meaning her work was made from around 1945 to the present. She has held numerous solo exhibitions around the United States, and her work has been seen in group shows as well. Her piece Guardian of Small Beasts of 1972 is in the collection of the Spencer Museum of Art.
