= Maggie Louie =

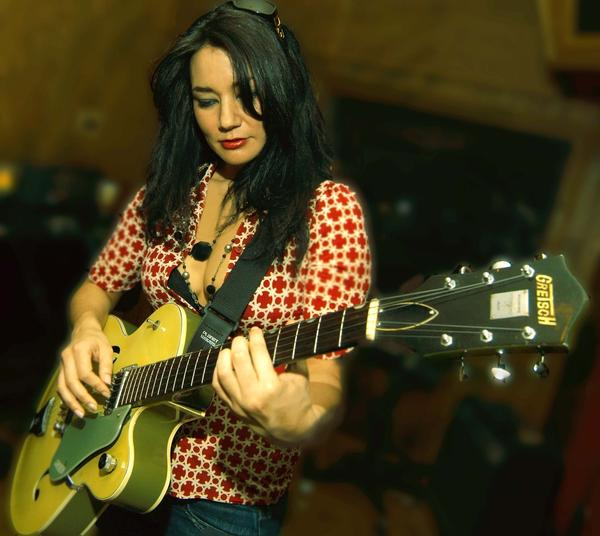
- Maggie Louie recording unreleased record "Flight Risk" at Ardent Studios

Background information
- Born: Margaret Crispin Louie; November 10, 1970; Pensacola, Florida, US
- Died: December 29, 2024 Tampa, Florida, US
- Genres: Rock 'n' roll, Blues, jam, hard rock, indie rock
- Occupations: Musician, singer, songwriter
- Instruments: Guitar, vocals
- Years active: 1983–2000

Maggie Louie (November 10, 1970) was an American songwriter, guitarist and singer who performed the pop single "Always Be Your Girl" featured on her solo album, Maggie Louie, released in 1999 and as the lead singer of the underground cult band Buttermilk which recorded four albums including Star Spangled Bubblegum (1993) and On Tap (1995). Louie's vocal talents have been described as providing a "fiery emotive delivery" for Buttermilk's "blues rock, jazz, funk, folk and H.O.R.D.E.-style groovy jams."

In 1998, Louie's life story was optioned as a feature film titled Sincerely Maggie but the movie was never produced.

Louie's song, "Junky Rhapsody" was featured on Grammy nominee Stanley C. Adkins' 2001 album The Undesirables which was produced by Alex Chilton in New Orleans, LA. Also in 2001, Louie played herself as the lead singer of a bar band in one scene of the TV-Movie, A Passion.

After a nearly yearlong battle with breast cancer, Louie died in Tampa, Florida, on December 29, 2024.

== Discography ==
=== Albums ===
- Zzoom – (1988) (Buttermilk)
- Live from the Chameleon – (Maple, 1990) (recorded as Maggie Louie & Buttermilk)
- Star Spangled Bubblegum – (Maple, 1993) (recorded as Maggie Louie & Buttermilk)
- On Tap – (Delta & Fishtone Records, 1995) (recorded as Maggie Louie & Buttermilk)
- Maggie Louie – (Orchard, 1999)
- Flight Risk – (unreleased)

=== Compilation Appearances ===
- Southern Sampler – (Lucky13, 1998)
- CMJ presents Certain Damage! Vol 106 – (CMJ, 1999)
- Women Who Rock – (Riffage, 1999)

=== Appears On ===
- The Undesirables – (Yukky Records, 2001)
