= Maggie Pogue Johnson =

American poet

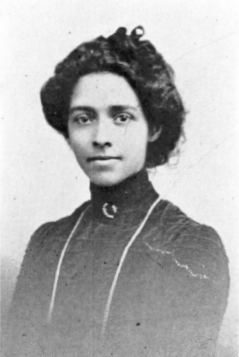
- Born: 1883; Fincastle, Virginia
- Died: 1956 (aged 72–73); Clifton Forge, Virginia
- Education: Virginia Normal and Industrial Institute
- Occupations: Poet, composer

Maggie Pogue Johnson (1883-1956) was an American composer and poet. She wrote verse in both standard English as well as in the dialect and speech patterns of Black Americans at the time, which still retained the influence of their speech from when they were enslaved.

== Biography ==
Johnson was born in Fincastle, Virginia, and educated in the Virginia Normal and Industrial Institute in Petersburg, Virginia. Her parents, Lucie Jane Banister Pogue and Rev. Samuel Pogue made sure their children were well-educated. This was important, considering the fields that she and her siblings ended up in, such as teaching, physics, pharmacy, and ministerial work. Johnson taught for two years and was also the president of the Literary and Debating Society in Covington, Virginia. She was the composer of "I Know That I Love You" and other songs, as well as the author of Virginia Dreams. Her poem The Story of Lovers Leap was inspired by a famous resorts in the South, Greenbrier White Sulpher Springs in West Virginia. Johnson's early poetry was part of a larger movement by Black women poets to create a model of womanhood that was an alternative to the dominant model of "True Womanhood" as a white, middle-class experience. Examples of her alternative model of womanhood can be seen in Old Maid's Soliloquy and Meal Time from Virginia Dreams. Her poem Poet of Our Race is dedicated to the late poet Paul Laurence Dunbar.

She married Doctor Walter W. Johnson of Staunton, Virginia in 1904, with whom she had one child, Walter W. Jr.. She married Dr. J.W. Shellcroft of West Virginia in 1938.

== Publications ==
- Virginia Dreams: Lyrics for an Idle Hour. Tales of the Time Told in Rhyme, publisher not identified, 1910.
- Thoughts for Idle Hours, Stone Printing & Manufacturing Company, 1915.
- Fallen Blossoms, Scholl Printing, 1951.
- Childhood Hours with Songs for Little Tots, publisher not identified, 1952.

== Gendered Dialect ==
Johnson aimed at confronting gender restrictions in her work despite its critical consequences on black female writers. Dialect poetry was mainly a male-attributed art and her use of it endangered her femininity, since black women were already thought to be uneducated and less feminine. Therefore the use of a language that did not abide by white standardized eloquence and correctness was considered risky and threatening. Johnson emphasizes this in her alternation between standard and dialect language in many of her poems. Doing so, she showcases how conditional it was for women of color to learn and use conventional language in order to be accepted in society. Moreover, in much of her poetry, both her male and female subjects serve as exemplars of educational development and moral strength, and as such support the idea of racial uplift.
