= Justin Lee sex scandal =

Series of sexual assaults in Taiwan

The Justin Lee （Chinese characters: 李宗瑞）rape scandal involves a Taiwanese socialite, Justin Lee, who was convicted of nine rapes, during which he had drugged women and then recorded the sexual assaults.

Lee is the son of former Yuanta Financial Holding Co board member Lee Yueh-tsang, and known for his presence at fashion parties and nightclubs. In 2011, two sisters filed a police report against Lee. During the investigation, the police discovered recorded files on Lee's computer and arrested him in November 2012. Prosecutors said that since August 2009, Lee had been drugging women or getting them drunk in luxury nightclubs around Taiwan, before taking them to his home to rape them while they were unconscious. Lee fled Taipei and was on the run for 23 days before turning himself in.

In the first sentencing at the Taipei district court, Lee was originally to be jailed for 22 years and had to pay compensation of 14.25 million New Taiwan dollars to the victims. On 2 September 2014, following an appeal, Lee's sentence was increased to 80 years' jail for his offences. However, he would only have to serve 30 years as that was the maximum punishment for those charges by law. He was also ordered to pay NT$27.75 million compensation to victims.
