= Maggie Simpson (musician) =

American musician

Maggie Simpson is an American acoustic guitarist and singer from the Mountain West of the United States. She studied in Boston University's Professional Theater Training Program. Her musical style varies from straightforward acoustic folk music to indie folk to bluegrass and blues and roots. She has released two studio albums to date, OK Cafe (1999) and Angel of Thunder (2004), as well as contributing individual tracks to a number of compilation CDs and offering backup support to a number of similar artists.

"The strength of her play is that, without cliché or histrionics, she brings to life extremely dark experiences with wit, humour and wisdom. A singer-songwriter with a voice that recalls both Joni Mitchell and Joan Baez, Simpson impresses as an actress too." - The Scotsman

Simpson has backed-up many performers, including Doc Watson, Richard Shindell, Tom Rush, Martin Sexton, Chris Smither, Patty Larkin, Bela Fleck, Dan Fogelberg, Bill Morrissey, J.J. Cale, Jefferson Starship, Hot Tuna, and Warren Zevon. She also facilitates performance workshops, and is a frequent performance instructor at the Planet Bluegrass' Annual Folks Festival Song School.
