= Maggy Breittmayer =

Swiss violinist (1888–1961)

Maggy Breittmayer (2 September 1888 – 6 May 1961) was a Swiss violinist and academic.

== Life ==
She was born in Geneva, daughter of Henri Jean Breittmayer, an assistant judge and state councillor, and his wife Olga Amélie née Soltermann. She studied violin at the Conservatoire de Musique de Genève with Henri Marteau. In 1909, obtaining a scholarship from the Association of Swiss Musicians, she studied in Berlin with Carl Flesch.

From 1911 Breittmayer taught at Geneva Conservatory. She began a career as a concert violinist, playing in Switzerland, Paris, the Netherlands and Berlin, including works by contemporary Swiss composers Marguerite Roesgen-Champion and Émile Jaques-Dalcroze. Her solo career did not continue beyond the start of the First World War. She resumed teaching at Geneva Conservatory; in 1918 she was a founder member of the Orchestre de la Suisse Romande.

In the 1940s she presented radio broadcasts about the violin. She died in Geneva in 1961.
