= Maggy de Coster =

French journalist and poet

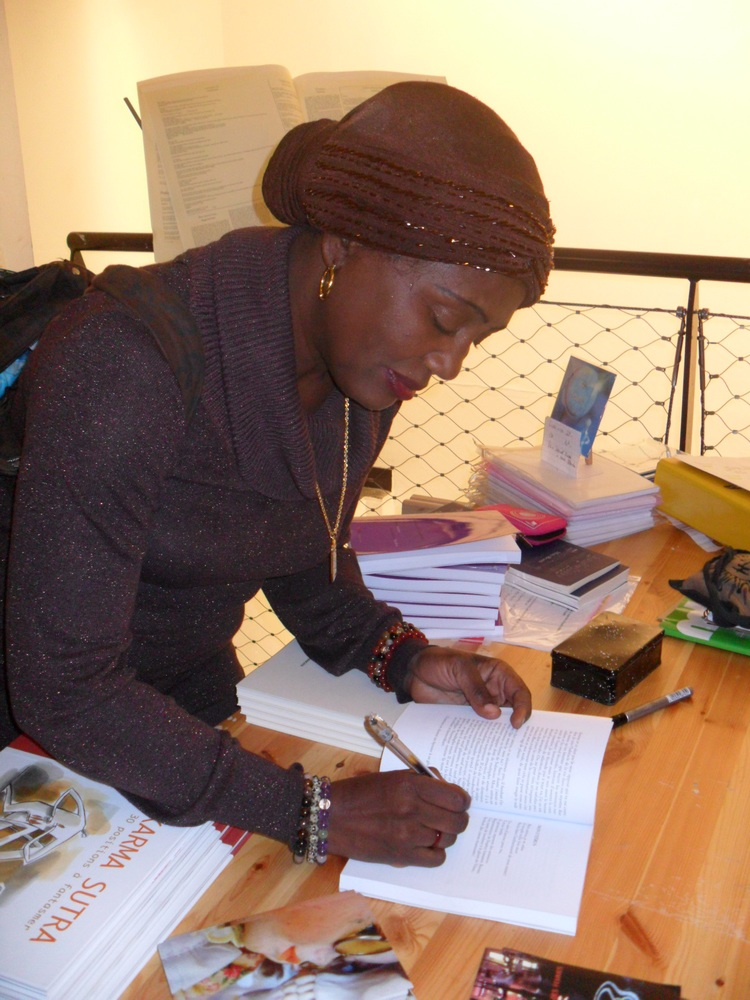
Maggy de Coster

Maggy de Coster (born April 23, 1966) is a Haitian-born writer living in France. Until 1987 (or possibly somewhat later), she wrote under her birth name Margareth Lizaire and is also known as Margareth Lizaire de Coster.

== Biography ==
She was born in Jérémie and worked as a reporter in Port-au-Prince for several years before moving in 1988 to Paris, where she further trained as a journalist at the French Press Institute and at the Centre de formation et de perfectionnement des journalistes and earned a Master of Advanced Studies (Diplôme d'études approfondies) in Social Rights and Relations from Panthéon-Assas University. She is a member of the French Association des femmes journalistes. She has worked as a journalist in Haiti, France, Switzerland, England and Barbados.

In 2000, she established the literary journal Manoir des Poètes and serves as its director. De Coster is a member of the French Société des gens de lettres and has served on the executive committee of the Société des poètes français. Her work has been included in a number of anthologies and has been translated into Spanish, Italian, English, Romanian and Arabic.

She is married and has four children.

== Awards and honours ==
De Coster received the Prix Jean-Cocteau in 2004 and the Prix de la chanson poétique in 2007 from the Grand concours international de Poésie Richelieu.

== Selected works ==
Sources:

- Nuits d’assaut, poetry (1981)
- Ondes Vives, poetry (1987)
- Rêves et Folie, poetry (1994)
- Mémoires inachevés d’une île moribonde, poetry (1995), received first prize for poetry from the Académie Internationale Il Convivio
- Analyse du discours de presse: Profil de deux hebdomadaires haitens: Haiti en marche et Haiti Observateur, essay (1996)
- Itinéraire interrompu d’une jeune femme journaliste, autobiography (1998), received the ruby Medal from the Académie Internationale de Lutèce
- La Tramontane des Soupirs ou le siège des marées, poetry (2002), received the ruby Medal from the Académie Internationale de Lutèce
- Petites histoires pour des nuits merveilleuses, children's stories (2004)
- Le Chant de Soledad, novel (2007), received the silver medal from the Académie Internationale de Lutèce
- Le Journalisme expliqué aux non-initiés, non-fiction (2007)
- Au gué des souvenirs, stories (2008)
- La sémaphore du temps, poetry (2010)
- Doux ramages pour petits diablotins, poems for children (2010)
