= Maggie Campbell-Culver =

Garden historian

Maggie Campbell-Culver FLS was a garden and plant historian, and a Fellow of The Linnean Society of London. She has worked on a number of gardens in Sussex and Cornwall and was the Garden Conservationist at Fishbourne Roman Palace near Chichester. In Cornwall, Campbell-Culver undertook the garden and landscape restoration of Mount Edgcumbe Country Park.

== Books ==
In September 2001, she published The Origin of Plants, a chronology of the plants introduced to Britain, and the people who have shaped Britain's garden history from the earliest times. The book was short-listed for a Guild of Garden Writers Award, and the paperback edition was published in Spring 2004.

Campbell-Culver was one of the editors for the 2006 edition of The Oxford Companion to the Garden, (Note: Campbell-Culver covered topics raging from plant collecting, botanical illustration, as well as biographies of Linnaeus, Carl (1707–78) to Wilson, Ernest Henry (1876–1930) in the 2006 edition of The Oxford Companion to the Garden.) and a contributor to the Insight Guide Great Gardens of Britain and Ireland as well as to the English Heritage Handbook on Management of Historic Parks, Gardens and Landscapes. The Eden Project Friends magazine has Campbell-Culver as a frequent contributor, while articles have been published in Country Life, The Tablet, and The Countryman as well as the French magazine Britmag.

A Passion for Trees, the Legacy of John Evelyn is Campbell-Culver's second book and was published in 2006. This focuses on a 1664 book Sylva, or, A Discourse of Forest Trees authored by John Evelyn (1620–1706), and commemorates the tercentenary of Evelyn's death. Campbell-Culver is a consultant to Lewes District Council for their project on the John Evelyn Heritage Centre at Southover Grange.

Directions for the Gardiner and Other Horticultural Advice was re-published by OUP in May 2009.

She has completed a book entitled Charlemagne and his Flora: The Foundation of European Cooking. This book describes the eighty-nine plants which in the year 800 the Emperor ordered to be grown on all Imperial land throughout his kingdom to feed the travelling court, the army, and to help avoid famine. She asserts that the chosen plants laid the foundation of modern European cooking.

== Other work ==
Campbell-Culver has given a series of plant talks on local radio in Brittany, where she also lectures. She has completed a lecture tour in Ireland and is a frequent contributor to BBC Radio 4's Woman's Hour. She has lectured at the Edinburgh International Book Festival, Dartington Festival, and the Garden History Society, and has enrolled as a Royal Horticultural Society Regional Lecturer.

She is a founder member of the National Council for the Conservation of Plants and Gardens (now Plant Heritage) and has been involved for many years with the Garden History Society and their Gardens Trust movement.

== Publications ==
- Maggie Campbell-Culver (2001). The origin of plants: the people and plants that have shaped Britain's garden history since the year 1000. London: Headline. ISBN 9780747272144. OCLC 1061519269.
- Maggie Campbell-Culver (2006). A passion for trees: the legacy of John Evelyn. London: Eden Project Books. ISBN 9781903919477. OCLC 537924432.
- Evelyn, John (2009). Campbell-Culver, Maggie (ed.). Directions for the gardiner and other horticultural advice. Oxford: Oxford University Press. ISBN 9781903919477.
