= Maggy Moulach =

Creature in Scottish folklore

Maggy Moulach (also known as Meg Mullach, Maggie Moloch, Maug Moulack, Maug Moulach, Mieg Moulach, Maug Vuluchd, May Moulach, Meg Molloch, Manch Monlach and Hairy Meg) is a character from Scottish folklore said to be a Highland brownie. According to the folklore, she had a son named Brownie-Clod, who was said to be a dobie. A dobie is a somewhat dull-witted, though well-intentioned, variety of brownie.

She is described as a 2 ft 0 in (0.61 m) tall creature with an impressive head of hair or (and), as said in other lore, with hairy hands; that is why she was sometimes called Hairy Meg. In some later versions of the story, it is said that she reached down chimneys and stole children. She was also capable of shapeshifting into a grasshopper.

== Legend ==
In the earlier legends, it is said that Meg and her son were living in Tullochgorm castle, which belonged to the Grant family. She performed the usual labors of brownie, but also helped the clan chief beat his opponents at chess. She also functioned as a banshee, announcing the deaths of members of this family.

=== Other legends ===
A folktale mentions a certain Fincastle Mill where none dare go for fear of the brownies said to protect the mill from trespassers.

One night, a girl went up to the mill as she did not have enough flour for her wedding cake. Because the miller has already left, she snuck in to grind the flour herself. She put on a pot of water to boil as she began grinding the meal.

The dobie who guarded the mill, Brownie-Clod, heard the commotion and found the audacious maiden hard at work. Keeping his distance, he asked for her name and the quick girl replied, "Oh, I'm Mise mi fein" which means "Oh, I am me myself". He again asked for her name, but again she said "Mi fein". As he approached her, she threw boiling water at him. He fled to his mother, Maggy Moulach, who asks who wounded him. Fatally burned by the boiling water, he gasps out "Me fein" (Me Myself) as he was told.

Maggy later finds out the trickery of the girl as she regularly brags to her friends of how she outsmarted a brownie. Maggy overhears the girl one day while walking past her window and takes vengeance. She throws a stool with such force that it kills the girl dead on the spot.

Another legend of Maggy tells how she found a home near a farm. She is such a good worker that the owner of the farm fires all the farmhands in order to rely solely upon Maggy's work. This enrages her such that she goes on strike and becomes a boggart, an entity similar to a poltergeist. She begins playing tricks on him until the farmer is obliged to hire back all the staff.

== Moral ==
The story of Maggy Moulach's vengeance for her son could be seen as a warning against excessive pride. It could also be to remind the reader that there will invariably be someone who loves each of us, no matter our appearance, and will avenge the injuries inflicted.

The tale of Maggy Moulach and the farmer could be seen as a warning not to take those who help for granted.
