= Maggie Wu (businesswoman) =

Chinese business executive

- 武卫
- Born: 23 May 1969 (age 57); Beijing
- Education: Capital University of Economics and Business
- Occupation: Chief financial officer of Alibaba Group
- Spouse: Michael Zhou
- Children: Myra Zhou, Mona Zhou

Wu Wei (simplified Chinese: 武卫; traditional Chinese: 武衛; pinyin: Wǔ Wèi), also known by her English name Maggie Wu, is a Chinese business executive who is the chief financial officer of Alibaba Group, a family of Internet-based businesses. She was responsible for instituting Alibaba.com's financial systems and organization leading up to its initial public offering in Hong Kong in November 2007, as well as co-leading the privatization of Alibaba.com in 2012.

== Career ==
Wu attended the Capital University of Economics and Business in Beijing for her bachelor's degree in accounting. Prior to joining Alibaba Group, Wu worked at KPMG in Beijing as a partner in audit practice for fifteen years. Wu joined Alibaba in July 2007 as executive director and chief financial officer of Alibaba.com Limited. She served as deputy chief financial officer of Alibaba Group Holding Limited from October 2011 to May 10, 2013.

She was voted best CFO in FinanceAsia's annual poll for Asia's Best Managed Companies in 2010. She was listed as one of Forbes's 50 Asia Power Businesswomen in 2015. She is a Member of the Association of Chartered Certified Accountants (ACCA) and the Chinese Institute of Certified Public Accountants.
