= List of names derived from gemstones =

List of names derived from gemstones include the following:

Gemstone	Name	Type	Meaning
Agate	Agate (name)	Given name / surname	
Amber	Amber (given name)	Given name	
Amber	Inbar (name)	Given name	Means amber in Hebrew.
Amethyst	Amethyst (given name)	Given name	
Azurite	Azura (given name)	Given name	
Beryl	Beryl (given name)	Given name	
Beryl	Heliodor	Given name / surname	It is a given and surname. Heliodor is a specimen of the mineral Beryl. Heliodor has a yellow, greenish yellow, or golden-yellow color. The given name has a Czech-Slovak origin.
Precious coral	Coral (given name)	Given name	
Precious coral	Coralie	Given name	
Precious coral	Coraline (given name)	Given name	
Celestine	Celestine	Given name	
Crystal	Crystal (name)	Given name	
Diamond	Almas	Given name / surname	Gender neutral name, means diamond in Arabic.
Diamond	Almaz	Given name	Feminine name, means diamond in Amharic.
Diamond	Diamond (given name)	Given name	
Diamond	Hira (given name)	Given name	Means diamond in Sanskrit.
Diamond	Hiro (given name)	Given name	Means diamond in the Sindhi language. Originates from the Sindh province in the Indian subcontinent.
Emerald	Emerald (given name)	Given name	
Emerald	Esmeralda (given name)	Given name	
Emerald	Esme	Given name	
Flint	Flint	Given name / surname	A form of quartz.
Garnet	Garnet (name)	Given name	
Jacinth	Jacinth	Given name	Jacinth is a feminine given name. The gem is a yellow-red to red-brown variety of zircon.
Jacinth	Hyacinth (given name)	Given name	Masculine and feminine given name.
Jade	Jade (given name)	Given name	
Jade	Giada	Given name	Means jade in Italian.
Jasper	Jasper (given name)	Given name	Means bringer of treasure in Persian.
Jet (gemstone)	Jet (name)	Given name / surname	A mineraloid derived from wood.
Jewellery, gemstone	Bijou	Given name / surname	Means jewel in French.
Jewellery, gemstone	Jewel (given name)	Given name	
Lapis lazuli	Rumi	Given name	Originates from Japanese and means "lapis lazuli" and "flow".
Malachite	Malachy (given name)	Given name	Originates from Ireland.
Onyx	Onyx	Given name / surname	From the quartz gemstone Onyx.
Opal	Opal (given name)	Given name	
Pearl	Dara	Given name	Feminine name. Means "compassion" or "pearl of wisdom" in Hebrew.
Pearl	Farida	Given name	Means unique/ precious pearl in Arabic.
Pearl	Greet	Given name	
Pearl	Greta (given name)	Given name	From the German word gret or grito meaning pearl.
Pearl	Gretchen	Given name	
Pearl	Grete	Given name	
Pearl	Grietje	Given name	
Pearl	Helmi	Given name / surname	Means pearl in Finnish.
Pearl	Madge (given name)	Given name	A girl's name of Greek origin, meaning "pearl"
Pearl	Maggie	Given name	
Pearl	Mairead	Given name	Originates from the Irish language and means pearl.
Pearl	Maisie (given name)	Given name	
Pearl	Małgorzata	Given name	
Pearl	Marga	Given name	
Pearl	Margaret	Given name	
Pearl	Margarete	Given name	
Pearl	Margaretha	Given name	
Pearl	Margarethe	Given name	
Pearl	Margarida	Given name	
Pearl	Margarita (given name)	Given name	From the Greek word margaritari (μαργαριτάρι), meaning pearl, which was borrowed from the Persians.
Pearl	Marge	Given name	
Pearl	Margherita	Given name	
Pearl	Margie	Given name	
Pearl	Margit	Given name	
Pearl	Margo (given name)	Given name	
Pearl	Margot	Given name	
Pearl	Margrethe	Given name	
Pearl	Margriet	Given name	
Pearl	Marguerite (given name)	Given name	
Pearl	Marit	Given name	
Pearl	Marjorie	Given name	
Pearl	Märta	Given name	
Pearl	Meg	Given name	
Pearl	Megan	Given name	
Pearl	Merete	Given name	
Pearl	Meta (name)	Given name	
Pearl	Metta (given name)	Given name	
Pearl	Mette	Given name	
Pearl	Pearl (given name)	Given name	
Pearl	Pegeen	Given name	
Pearl	Peggy (given name)	Given name	Diminutive name derived from Margaret.
Pearl	Pnina	Given name	Jewish feminine given name meaning "pearl" in Hebrew.
Pearl	Rita (given name)	Given name	Diminutive name derived from Margaret.
Ruby	Ruby (given name)	Given name	
Sapphire	Sapir (surname)	Given name / surname	Means sapphire or lapis lazuli in Hebrew.
Sapphire	Neel	Given name	Greek origin, Nile River; blue sapphire.
Sapphire	Neelam (given name)	Given name	Originates from India. From the Sanskrit word for sapphire.
Sapphire	Neelum	Given name	Variant of Neelam.
Zircon (yellow)	Goldie	Given name	

== See also ==
- Gemstone
- Jewellery
