= Margarethe =

- Pronunciation: German: [maɐ̯ɡaˈʁeːtə]
- Gender: Female
- Language: German

Origin
- Origin: Persian
- Meaning: "Pearl"
- Region of origin: Germanosphere

Other names
- Related names: Margaret, Daisy, Gretchen, Gretel, Grethe, Greta, Maggie, Máiréad, Madge, Marguerite, Margarita, Margareta, Margaretta, Margarida, Margarete, Marge, Margherita, Margo, Margot, Margie, Margit, Margrit, Megan, Mette, Maisie, Małgorzata, Rita, Peggy

Margarethe is a feminine given name, related to Margaret. People bearing the name include:

- Archduchess Margarethe Klementine of Austria (1870–1955), Archduchess of Austria and Princess of Bohemia, Hungary and Tuscany
- Margarethe Arndt-Ober (1885–1971), German operatic contralto
- Margarethe Cammermeyer (born 1942), Washington National Guard colonel honorably discharged for disclosing she was a lesbian
- Maria Margarethe Danzi (1768–1800), German composer and soprano
- Margarethe Düren (1904–1988), German operatic soprano
- Margarethe Hardegger (1882–1963), Swiss women's rights activist and trade unionist
- Margarethe Lachmund (1896–1985), German resistance fighter
- Margarethe von Oven (1904–1991), German accomplice in the 20 July plot to assassinate Hitler
- Margarethe von der Saale (1522–1566), German morganatic spouse by bigamy to Philip I, Landgrave of Hesse
- Margarethe Schreinemakers (born 1958), German television presenter, talk show host and journalist
- Margarethe Selenka (1860–1922), German zoologist, anthropologist, feminist and pacifist
- Margarethe Siems (1879–1952), German operatic soprano and voice teacher
- Margarethe Stockhausen (1803–1877), opera singer from Alsace
- Margarethe von Trotta (born 1942), German film director

== See also ==
- Margrethe II (born 1940), Queen of Denmark
