= Margrit =

- Gender: Female

Origin
- Meaning: Pearl

Other names
- Related names: Maggie, Máiréad, Madge, Marguerite, Margarita, Margaret, Margareta, Margaretta, Margarida, Margarete, Marge, Margherita, Margo, Margot, Margie, Margit, Meg, Megan, Mette, Maisie, Małgorzata, Rita, Peggy

Margrit is a given name, an equivalent to the English name Margaret.

Notable people with this name include:

- Margrit Bolli (1919–2017), Swiss dancer
- Margrit Brückner (born 1946), German sociologist and professor
- Margrit Conrad (1918–2005), Swiss singer
- Margrit Gertsch (born 1939), Swiss alpine skier
- Margrit Hess (born 1947), Swiss middle-distance runner
- Margrit Kennedy (1939 –2013), German architect, professor, environmentalist, author and advocate
- Margrit Klinger (born 1960), German middle-distance runner
- Margrit Läubli (born 1928), Swiss actress, comedian, dancer and radio personality
- Margrit Mondavi (1925–2016), American businesswoman
- Margrit Olfert (born 1947), East German athlete
- Margrit Rainer (1914–1982), Swiss actress
- Margrit Selke (1900–2004), specialist in biodynamic agriculture
- Margrit Shildrick, interdisciplinary academic
- Margrit Schiller (born 1948), German far-left activist
- Margrit Thomet (1952–1990), Swiss swimmer
- Margrit Thommen, Swiss orienteering competitor
- Margrit Tooman (born 1971), Estonian pentathlete
- Margrit von Braun (born 1952), American environmental scientist and educator
- Margrit Waltz (born 1957), German-American aviator and ferry pilot
- Margrit Weber-Röllin (1937–2024), Swiss schoolteacher and politician
- Margrit Zimmermann (1927–2020), Swiss composer, conductor, pianist, and music educator

== See also ==
- Margaret
