= Margarete =

- Gender: Female

Other names
- Alternative spelling: Margaret, Margarethe, Margareta, Margaretta, Margaretha, Margrethe

Margarete is a German feminine given name. It is derived from Ancient Greek margarites (μαργαρίτης), meaning "the pearl". Via the Latin margarita, it arrived in the German sprachraum. Related names in English include Daisy, Greta, Gretchen, Madge, Mae, Mag, Magee, Magdy, Magga, Maggie, Maggy, Maidie, Maisie, Marg, Margaret, Marguerite, Margarita, Margareta, Margarida, Marge, Margery, Marget, Margo, Margot, Marjorie, Marjory, Matge, May, Meg, Megan, Mairead, Mer, Meta, Rita, Molly, Peg and Peggy.

== People named Margarete ==
- Margarete Weißkirchner (1460–1500), commoner and common-law spouse of Philip I, Count of Hanau-Münzenberg
- Margarete of Brunswick-Wolfenbüttel (1516 or 1517–1580), a princess of Brunswick-Wolfenbüttel by birth, Duchess of Münsterberg, Oels and Bernstadt by marriage
- Princess Margarete Karola of Saxony (1900–1962), Duchess of Saxony, Princess of Hohenzollern by marriage
- Archduchess Margarete Sophie of Austria (1870–1902), Archduchess of Austria and Princess of Bohemia, Hungary, and Tuscany by birth, Duchess of Württemberg by marriage
- Archduchess Margarethe Klementine of Austria (1870–1955), Archduchess of Austria and Princess of Bohemia, Hungary, and Tuscany by birth, Princess of Thurn and Taxis by marriage
- Margarete Adler (1896–1990), Austrian freestyle swimmer, diver and gymnastics teacher, first Austrian woman Summer Olympics medalist (with her relay teammates)
- Margarete Bagshaw (1964–2015), American painter and potter
- Margarete Bieber (1879–1978), Jewish German art historian, classical archaeologist and professor, the second woman university professor in Germany
- Margarete Böhme (1867–1939), German writer
- Margarete Bonnevie (1884–1970), Norwegian author, feminist and politician
- Margarete Buber-Neumann (1901–1989), German writer, communist and later anti-communist
- Margarete Cranmer (d. c. 1571), second wife of the reformation Archbishop of Canterbury, Thomas Cranmer
- Margarete Depner (1885–1970), Romanian sculptor, painter and illustrator
- Margarete Dessoff (1874–1944), German choral conductor, singer and voice teacher
- Margarete Gussow (1896–?), German astronomer
- Margarete Haagen (1889–1966), German stage and film actress
- Margarete Haimberger-Tanzer (1916–1987), Austrian lawyer, prosecutor and judge
- Margarete Heymann (1899–1990), German ceramic artist
- Margarete Hilferding (1871–1942), Austrian Jewish teacher, doctor, individual psychologist and first woman admitted into the Vienna Psychoanalytic Society
- Margarete Himmler (1893–1967), wife of Reichsführer-SS Heinrich Himmler
- Margarete Kahn (1880–1942?), German mathematician and Holocaust victim
- Grete Keilson (1905–1999), German communist politician
- Margarete Klose (1899–1968), German operatic mezzo-soprano
- Margarete Kollisch (1893–1979), Austrian writer and poet
- Margarete Köstlin-Räntsch (1880-1945), one of Germany's first female doctors
- Margarete Kupfer (1881–1953), German actress
- Margarete Lanner (1896–1981), German stage and film actress
- Margarete Mitscherlich-Nielsen (1917–2012), German psychoanalyst
- Margarete Neumann (1917–2002), German writer and lyrical poet
- Margarete Pioresan (born 1956), Brazilian former football goalkeeper
- Margarete Robsahm (born 1942), Norwegian model, actress and director
- Margarete Schlegel (1899–1987), German actress
- Margarete Schütte-Lihotzky (1897–2000), first female Austrian architect and communist anti-Nazi resistance member
- Margarete Schön (1895–1985), German stage and film actress
- Margarete Seeler (1909–1996), German-born American artist, designer, educator, and author; known for her cloisonné work.
- Margarete Sommer (1893–1965), German Catholic social worker and lay Dominican who saved Jews from the Holocaust
- Margarete Steffin (1908–1941), German actress and writer, one of Bertold Brecht's lovers and closest collaborators
- Margarete Steiff (1847–1909), German seamstress who founded Margarete Steiff GmbH, the toy stuffed animal manufacturer
- Margarete Teschemacher (1903–1959), German operatic soprano
- Margarete Wallmann (1901 or 1904–1992), ballerina, choreographer, stage designer and opera director in Austria
- Margarete von Wrangell (1877–1932), Baltic German agricultural chemist, the first female full professor at a German university
