= Märta =

- Gender: Female
- Name day: 11 May

Origin
- Origin: Derived from Latin Margarita, a borrowing of the Greek μαργαριτης (margarites) meaning "pearl"; possibly ultimately a borrowing from Sanskrit मञ्यरी (manyari).
- Meaning: Pearl
- Region of origin: Sweden

Other names
- Related names: Margareta, Märtha, Greta

Märta or Märtha is a Swedish feminine given name. The name is often a diminutive of Margareta. Individuals bearing the name Märta/Märtha include:

- Märta of Denmark (1277–1341), Queen consort of Sweden
- Märtha of Sweden (1901-1954), Crown Princess of Norway
- Märta Adlerz (1897–1979), Swedish diver
- Märta Allertz (1628–c. 1677), royal mistress of Charles X of Sweden
- Märta Andersson (born 1925), Swedish gymnast
- Märta Berendes (1639–1717), Swedish Baroness and diarist
- Märta Björnbom (1888–1973), Swedish lawyer
- Märta Blomstedt (1899–1982), Finnish architect
- Märta Bucht (1882–1962), Swedish schoolteacher, suffragist and peace activist
- Märta Dorff (1909–1990), Swedish actress
- Märta Eketrä (1851–1894), Swedish lady-in-waiting to Sophia of Nassau
- Märta Johansson (diver) (1907–1998), Swedish diver
- Märta Leijonhufvud (1520–1584), Swedish noble; sister of Queen Margaret Leijonhufvud
- Märtha Leth (1877-1953), Swedish pharmacist
- Märta Ljungberg (1656–1741), Swedish innkeeper
- Märta Norberg (born 1922), Swedish cross-country skier
- Märta Helena Reenstierna (1753–1841), Swedish diarist
- Märta Strömberg (1921–2012), Swedish archaeologist
- Märta Tikkanen (born 1935), Finnish writer
- Märta Torén (1925–1957), Swedish actress
- Märta Ulfsdotter (1319-1371), Swedish lady-in-waiting to Margaret I of Denmark
