= Greta Valley =

Town in Canterbury, New Zealand

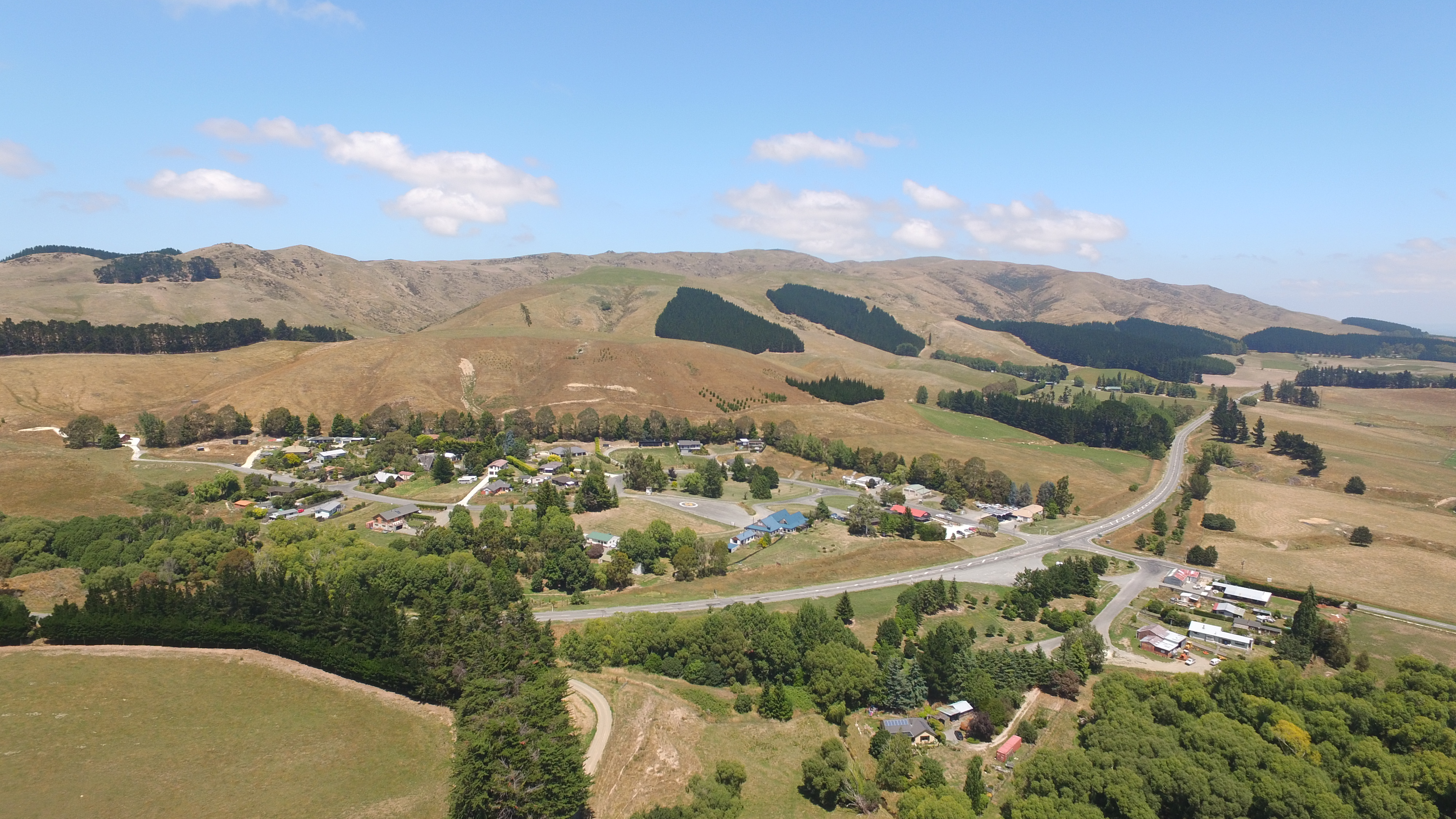
- Greta Valley village looking in a south easterly direction
- Interactive map of Greta Valley
- Coordinates: 42°57′50″S 172°58′04″E
- Country: New Zealand
- Region: Canterbury
- Territorial authority: Hurunui District
- Ward: East Ward

Area
  - Total: 145.39 km^{2} (56.14 sq mi)

Population (2023 census)
  - Total: 207
  - Density: 1.42/km^{2} (3.69/sq mi)
- Time zone: UTC+12 (New Zealand Standard Time)
  - Summer (DST): UTC+13 (New Zealand Daylight Time)

Greta Valley is a town in North Canterbury, 83 km north of Christchurch, New Zealand. It was named after the River Greta in Yorkshire by local runholders Sir Charles Clifford and Sir Frederick Weld in the 1850s, but it is to the east of the Greta River and on the south bank of the Waikari River.

It is situated approximately halfway between Christchurch and Cheviot just off State Highway 1.

== 2016 earthquake ==
At 18:13 on 22 November 2016, an earthquake with a magnitude of 5.7 struck the town of Scargill, 2 kilometres northwest of Greta Valley. The earthquake was described by locals as severe due to its shallow depth of 7 kilometres. As a result, there was significant damage to the local community hall, houses, and water tanks. The earthquake was considered an aftershock of the 2016 Kaikōura earthquake.

== Demographics ==
Greta Valley and its surrounds cover 145.39 km^{2} (56.14 sq mi). It is part of the larger Omihi statistical area.

Historical population
Year	Pop.	±% p.a.
2006	183	—
2013	198	+1.13%
2018	195	−0.30%
2023	207	+1.20%

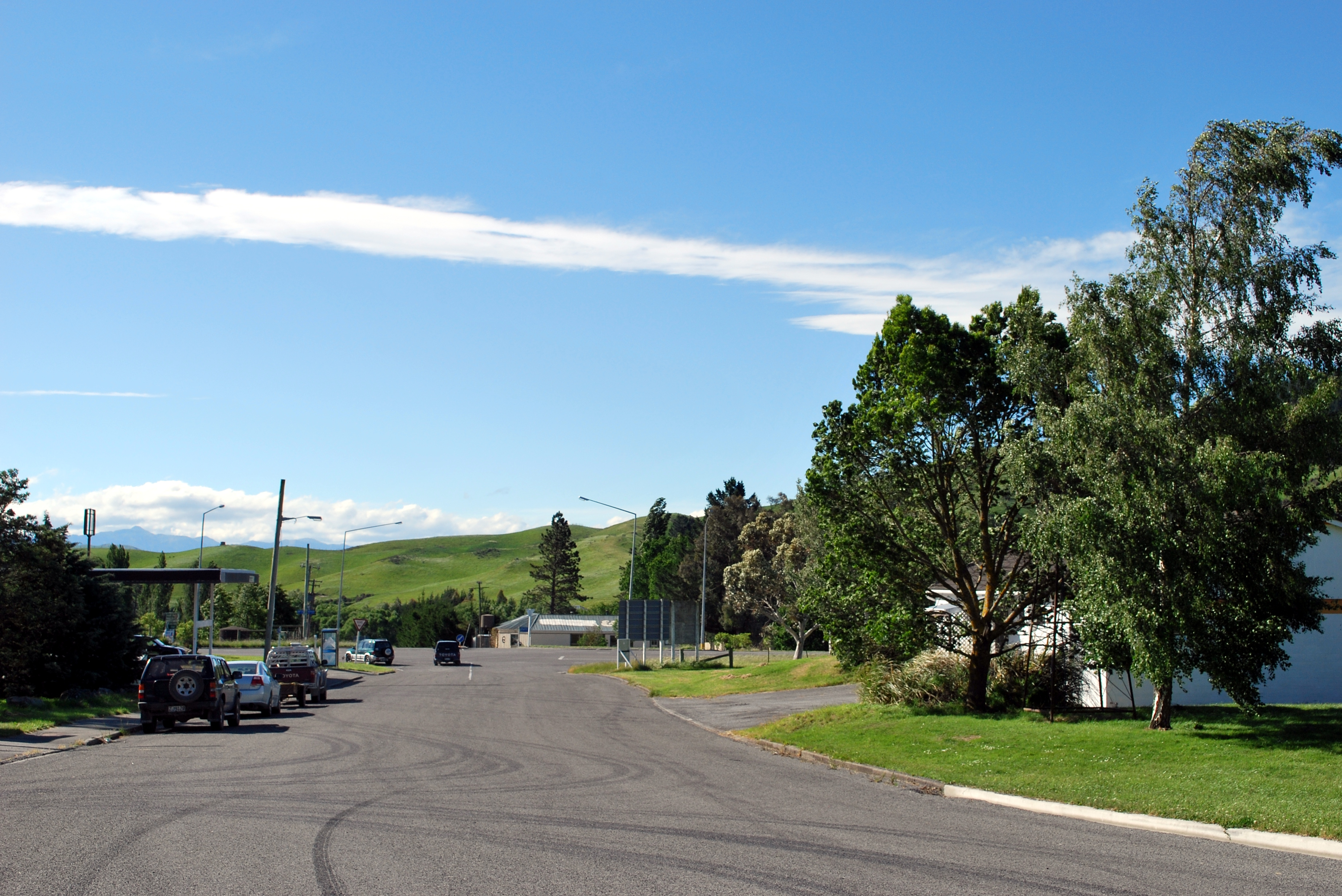
Greta Valley looking toward the intersection with New Zealand State Highway 1

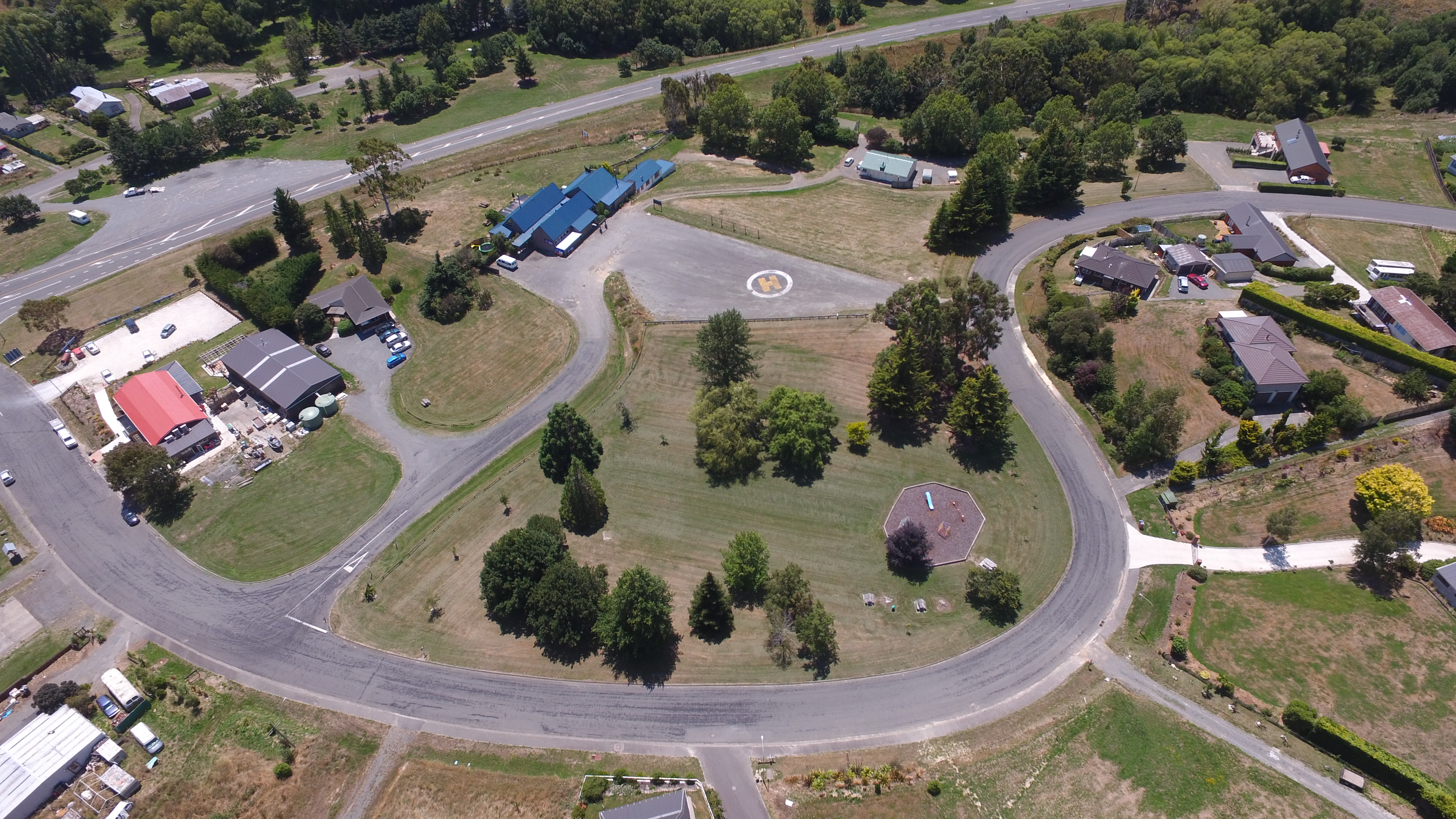
Tavern Reserve, Picnic Area and Playground

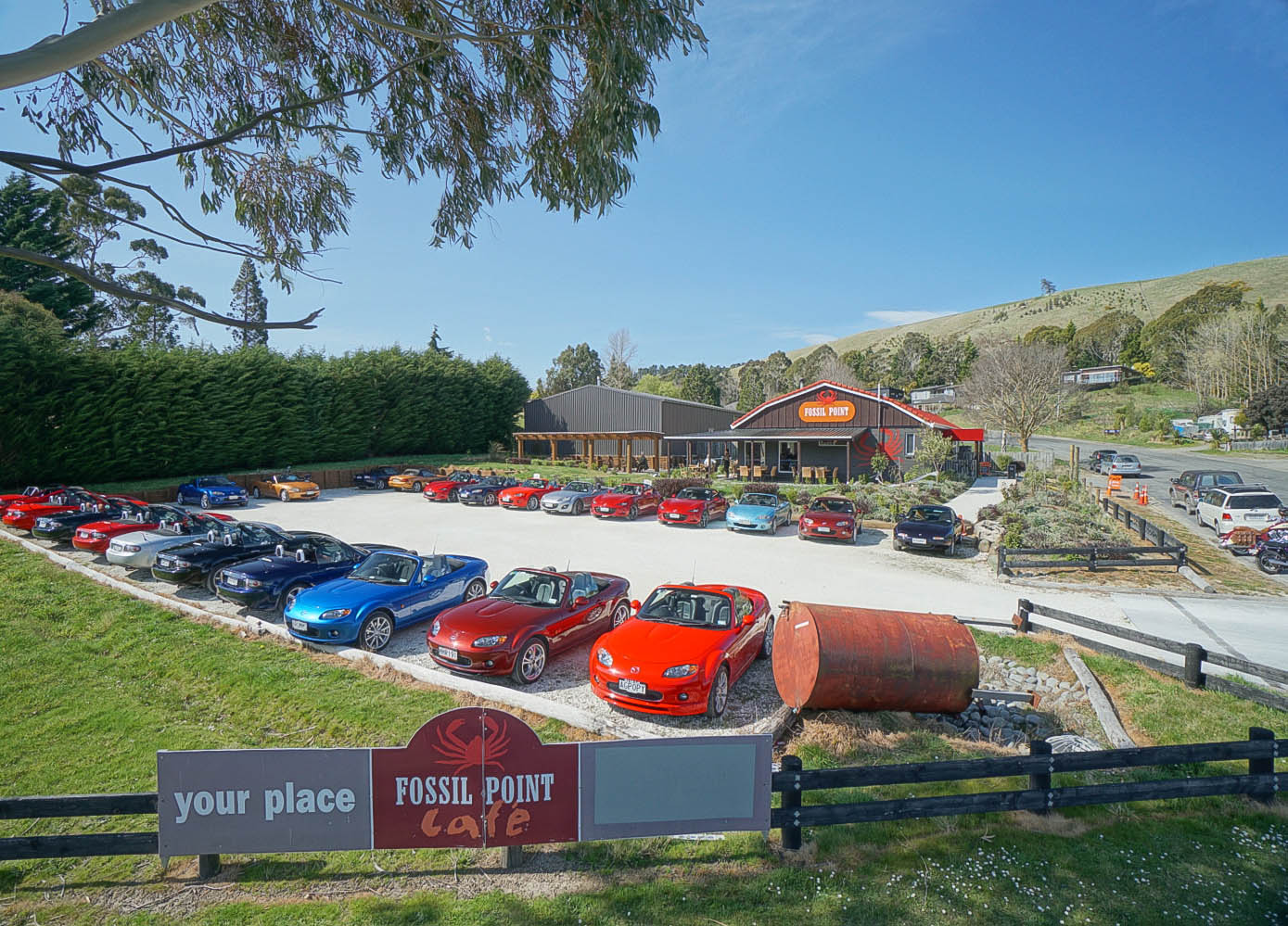
Local Cafe

Greta Valley had a population of 207 in the 2023 New Zealand census, an increase of 12 people (6.2%) since the 2018 census, and an increase of 9 people (4.5%) since the 2013 census. There were 111 males and 99 females in 93 dwellings. 1.4% of people identified as LGBTIQ+. The median age was 47.6 years (compared with 38.1 years nationally). There were 42 people (20.3%) aged under 15 years, 24 (11.6%) aged 15 to 29, 99 (47.8%) aged 30 to 64, and 42 (20.3%) aged 65 or older.

People could identify as more than one ethnicity. The results were 97.1% European (Pākehā); 8.7% Māori; 1.4% Middle Eastern, Latin American and African New Zealanders (MELAA); and 4.3% other, which includes people giving their ethnicity as "New Zealander". English was spoken by 98.6%, Māori by 1.4%, and other languages by 5.8%. No language could be spoken by 1.4% (e.g. too young to talk). The percentage of people born overseas was 14.5, compared with 28.8% nationally.

Religious affiliations were 31.9% Christian, and 1.4% New Age. People who answered that they had no religion were 55.1%, and 10.1% of people did not answer the census question.

Of those at least 15 years old, 39 (23.6%) people had a bachelor's or higher degree, 99 (60.0%) had a post-high school certificate or diploma, and 27 (16.4%) people exclusively held high school qualifications. The median income was $31,600, compared with $41,500 nationally. 9 people (5.5%) earned over $100,000 compared to 12.1% nationally. The employment status of those at least 15 was 81 (49.1%) full-time and 36 (21.8%) part-time.

== Education ==
Greta Valley School is a co-educational state primary school for Year 1 to 8 students, with a roll of 35 as of July 2026. Facilities include a swimming pool, two playing fields, a tennis court and a library. The school opened in 1893. Scargill School opened in 1907 and merged to Greta Valley School in 1980.
