= Amethyst (disambiguation) =

Amethyst is a semi-precious form of quartz.

Amethyst or Améthyste may also refer to:

== Fiction ==
- Amethyst, Princess of Gemworld, comics franchise
- Amethyst Van Der Troll, from Trollz animation series
- Bewitching Smile Amethyst, an attribute of Shizuru Fujino in animation franchise My-Otome
- Amethyst (Steven Universe), a fictional character from Steven Universe

== Ships ==
- HMS Amethyst, various British warships
- USS Amethyst (PYc-3), of the US (1940s)
- HMT Amethyst, a 1934 naval trawler
- Améthyste, Haitian warship, a.k.a. French frigate Félicité
- French submarine Améthyste (S605), a 1988 nuclear-powered submarine

== Music ==
- Adam and the Amethysts, Canadian band led by Adam Waito
- Amethyst (Billy Hart album), 1993
- Amethyst (mixtape), a 2015 mixtape by Tinashe
- "Amethyst", single by The Awakening from The Fourth Seal of Zeen
- "Amethyst", song by Yoshiki
- "Amethyst", song by Fightstar from They Liked You Better When You Were Dead
- "Amethyst", song by Scott Weiland and the Wildabouts from Blaster
- “Amethyst”, song by Deafheaven from their 2025 album Lonely People with Power

== Other uses ==
- Amethyst (color)
- Amethyst (given name)
- Amethyst Initiative, American activist organization
- Browallia americana, plant also known as Amethyst flower
- Amethyst gas field, gas field in the UK
- Amethyst, Russian anti-ship missile
- Brand name for a type of birth control that includes ethinylestradiol/levonorgestrel
- Amethyst (drag queen), American drag queen
