= Giada =

- Gender: Female

Origin
- Meaning: "Jade"

Other names
- Related names: Jade

Giada is a feminine Italian given name meaning "jade".

== List of people with the given name Giada ==
- Giada Abate, Italian footballer
- Giada Andreutti, Italian athlete and bobsledder
- Giada Arney, American astrobiologist
- Giada Ballan, Italian former synchronized swimmer
- Giada Borghesi, Italian professional racing cyclist
- Giada Colagrande, Italian film director and actress
- Giada Corradini, Italian rugby union player
- Giada D'Antonio, Italian alpine ski racer
- Giada De Laurentiis, Italian American chef, writer and television personality
- Giada Gallina, Italian former sprinter
- Giada Russo, Italian figure skater
- Giada Trebeschi, Italian writer
- Giada Valenti, Italian singer
- Giada Wiltshire, Italian beauty pageant contestant

Other

- Giada, Italian fashion brand

== See also ==
List of names derived from gemstones
