= Margaretta (disambiguation) =

Margaretta is a genus of plants in the family Apocynaceae. Margaretta may also refer to:

- Margaretta (bryozoan), genus of bryozoans
- Margaretta (given name), people with the name
- Margaretta Township, Erie County, Ohio
  - Margaretta High School, public high school in Castalia, Ohio
