= Grethe =

Grethe is a given name derived from Margarethe. Notable people with the name include:

- Grethe and Jørgen Ingmann, Danish singers and musicians
- Grethe Fossli (born 1954), Norwegian politician for the Labour Party
- Grethe Grünberg (born 1988), Estonian ice dancer
- Grethe Gynnild Johnsen (born 1959), Norwegian journalist
- Grethe Holmer (1924–2004), Danish actress
- Grethe Ingmann (1938–1990), Danish singer
- Grethe Kausland (1947–2007), Norwegian singer, performer and actress
- Grethe Krogh (1928–2018), Danish organist and professor
- May Grethe Lerum (born 1965), Norwegian novelist
- Grethe Fenger Møller (born 1941), Danish politician
- Grethe Nielsen (1926–2017), Danish sprinter
- Grethe Philip (1916–2016), Danish politician
- Grethe Rask (1930–1977), Danish physician and surgeon who practiced medicine in what was then known as Zaire
- Grethe Rytter Hasle (born 1920), Norwegian planktologist
- Grethe Sønck (1929–2010), Danish actress and singer
- Grethe Thordahl (1926–2004), Danish stage and film actress
- Grethe Weiser (1903–1970), German actress

== See also ==
- Hildegard Grethe (1898–1961), German actress
