= Ingeborg Walin =

Swedish women's rights activist and home economics educator

Ingeborg Walin (1868–1936), was a Swedish women's rights activist and educator in home economics. She was a pioneer in promoting home economics in the Swedish school system from the late 19th-century, and was awarded the royal medal Illis quorum in recognition of her contributions.

== Life ==
Walin was born in 1868 in Leksand, her father was a sexton and organist, and she received a good education in a comfortable home. She trained as a teacher at the Högre lärarinneseminariet, graduating in 1888. She then had further training at Stockholm College. In 1891 she embarked on a trip to Germany, Belgium and England to study the teaching of cookery in different places, accompanied by Ida Norrby. Her trip was funded by a scholarship from the Swedish state. Both Walin and Norrby became important figures in the cookery education in Swedish schools.

After the study trip, Walin ran the Högre lärarinneseminariet’s new home economics school, which from 1926 was known as the Statens skolköksseminarium (the national school cookery training school). She ran the school until 1919, when it was taken over by Ingeborg Schager. Schager and Walin worked with Gertrud Bergström, another school cookery teacher, and the three also lived together in Stockholm. In order to advance the cause of school cookery lessons, Walin wrote teaching resources and produced cookery books and recipe collections. She represented Sweden at the international conferences in Ghent (1913) and Paris (1922).

She was the chair of Svenska Kvinnors Medborgarförbund in 1921–1936, and a member of the central committee of the International Alliance of Women. Walin was awarded the royal medal Illis quorum in recognition of her general contributions to Sweden. She died in 1936.
