= Metta =

Metta may refer to:

== Buddhism ==
- Maitrī (a.k.a. mettā), a Buddhist concept of love and kindness
- Metta Institute, a Buddhist training institute
- Mettā Forest Monastery, Valley Center, California, USA; a Buddhist monastery

== Other uses ==
- Metta (given name)
- FK Metta, Riga, Latvia; a soccer team

== See also ==
- LaMetta Wynn (1933–2021), U.S. politician
- Meta (disambiguation)
- Maitri (disambiguation)
