= Svenska Kvinnors Medborgarförbund =

Swedish women's organization

Svenska Kvinnors Medborgarförbund (SKM) ('Swedish Women's Citizens' Union') was a Swedish women's organization, founded in March 1921.

SKM was founded by members of the former National Association for Women's Suffrage (Sweden). When women's suffrage was finally achieved in 1921, the Association for Women's Suffrage was dissolved, and the SKM was founded to support, inform about and enforce the newly acquired citizen rights of women, and assure that the new gender equality enforced in reality and not merely a formal right on paper only.

The SKM was a politically neutral association who worked for Swedish women's rights with the stated goal "to make the women of Sweden competent citizens and peace loving members of the world", and to enforce assist women to make use of the rights afforded them. The SKM organized courses and collections, arranged lectures and petitioned the government and other authorities in various issues, often with the goal to increase women's equal treatment.

One of the issues the SKM prioritized was women's education for public office and increased representation in all public and political levels. In 1927, the SKM founded the Föreningen Kvinnolistan (Literary: 'The Women's List Association') to lobby for more women in political office and particularly more women in Parliament.

Chairperson

- 1921-1936: Ingeborg Walin
- 1936-1963: Ellen Hagen
- 1963-1971: Märta Björnbom
