= Gretel =

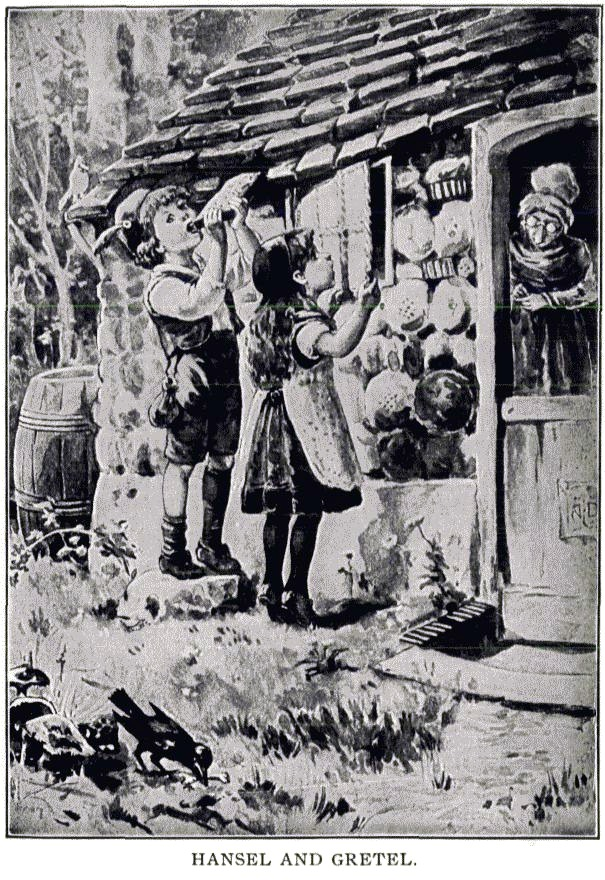
- Hansel and Gretel
- Language: German

Other names
- Variant form: Margarete

Gretel is a German shortening of the given name Margarete, meaning "pearl".

Notable people with this given name include:

- Gretel, a fictional character in the Brothers Grimm fairy tale Hansel and Gretel
- Gretel Beer (1921–2010), Austrian-born English author of cooking books and travel reports and newspaper cookery writer
- Gretel Bergmann (1914–2017), German Jewish high jumper who was prevented from competing in the 1936 Berlin Olympics
- Gretel Ehrlich (born 1946), American travel writer, poet, and essayist
- Gretel Grant-Gomez, a fictional character from the Disney Channel animated series Hamster & Gretel
- Gretel Killeen (born 1963), Australian presenter
- Gretel Oberhollenzer-Rogger (born 1958), Italian ski mountaineer
- Gretel Scarlett (born 1987), Australian actress
- Gretel Tippett (born 1993), Australian netball player and former WNBL basketball player

== See also ==
- Gretl, an open source statistical package
