= River Greta =

River Greta may refer to:

- River Greta, Cumbria, England
- River Greta, Durham, England
- River Greta (Lune), England
- Greta River, New Zealand
