= Greta River =

Coordinates: 42°54′32″S 173°06′11″E

- Location of the mouth within New Zealand

Location
- Country: New Zealand

Physical characteristics
- Source
  - location: Hurunui District
- Mouth
  - location: Hurunui River

The Greta River is a river in the Hurunui District of New Zealand. It flows north-east into the Hurunui River, which runs into the Pacific Ocean south of Cheviot, New Zealand. State Highway 1 follows the river for part of its route between Cheviot and Waipara. The locality of Greta Valley is to the east of the Greta River on the banks of the Waikari River. The river was named by local runholders Sir Charles Clifford and Sir Frederick Weld in the 1850s after the Greta River in Yorkshire.

== See also ==
- List of rivers of New Zealand
