= Omihi =

Locality in Canterbury, New Zealand

- Locality
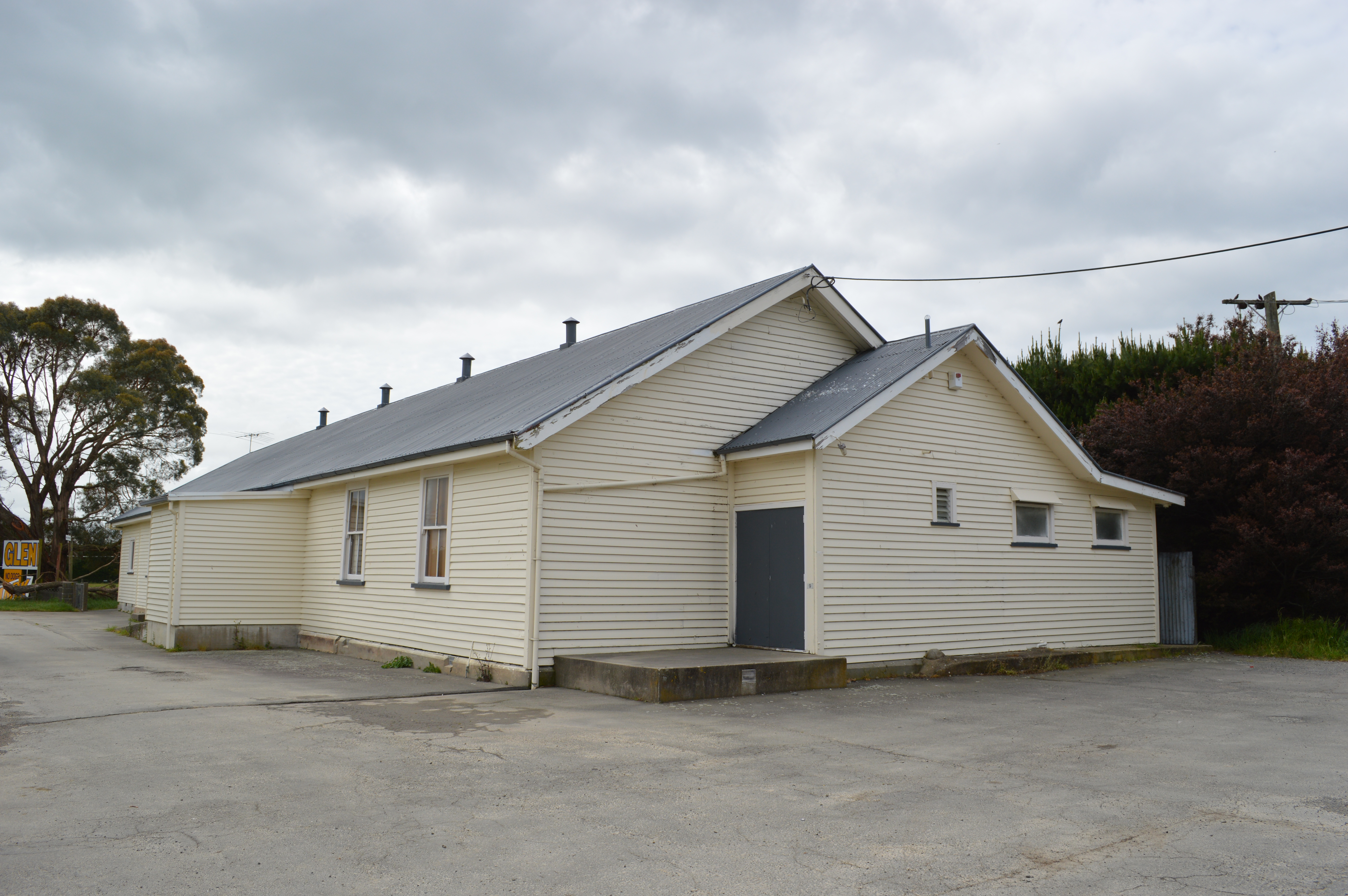
- Omihi Hall
- Interactive map of Omihi
- Coordinates: 43°01′S 172°51′E
- Country: New Zealand
- Region: Canterbury
- Territorial authority: Hurunui District
- Ward: East Ward
- Electorates: Kaikōura; Te Tai Tonga

Government
  - Territorial Authority: Hurunui District Council
  - Regional council: Environment Canterbury
  - Mayor of Hurunui: Marie Black
  - Kaikoura MP: Stuart Smith
  - Te Tai Tonga MP: Tākuta Ferris

Area
  - Total: 238.47 km^{2} (92.07 sq mi)

Population (2023 census)
  - Total: 270
  - Density: 1.1/km^{2} (2.9/sq mi)
- Time zone: UTC+12 (New Zealand Standard Time)
  - Summer (DST): UTC+13 (New Zealand Daylight Time)

Omihi or Ōmihi is a rural community in the Hurunui District of the Canterbury Region, on New Zealand's South Island. It is located 21km north-east of Amberley.

Translated from Māori, it means place of (Ō) greeting, wailing or lamentation (mihi).

European settlers began farming the area in the late 19th century.

The Omihi settlement includes a school and a community hall, which is used for a range of functions.

The settlement has a war memorial obelisk, featuring the names of ten local men who died in World War I and five local men who died in World War II.

== Demographics ==
Omihi locality covers 238.47 km^{2} (92.07 sq mi). It is part of the larger Omihi statistical area.

Historical population for Omihi locality
Year	Pop.	±% p.a.
2006	285	—
2013	309	+1.16%
2018	300	−0.59%
2023	270	−2.09%
The 2006 population is for a smaller area of 211.35 km^{2}. Source:

Omihi had a population of 270 in the 2023 New Zealand census, a decrease of 30 people (−10.0%) since the 2018 census, and a decrease of 39 people (−12.6%) since the 2013 census. There were 132 males, 135 females, and 3 people of other genders in 117 dwellings. 3.3% of people identified as LGBTIQ+. There were 45 people (16.7%) aged under 15 years, 39 (14.4%) aged 15 to 29, 126 (46.7%) aged 30 to 64, and 66 (24.4%) aged 65 or older.

People could identify as more than one ethnicity. The results were 97.8% European (Pākehā), 10.0% Māori, and 2.2% other, which includes people giving their ethnicity as "New Zealander". English was spoken by 98.9%, Māori by 1.1%, and other languages by 4.4%. No language could be spoken by 1.1% (e.g. too young to talk). The percentage of people born overseas was 11.1, compared with 28.8% nationally.

The sole religious affiliation given was 28.9% Christian. People who answered that they had no religion were 60.0%, and 11.1% of people did not answer the census question.

Of those at least 15 years old, 54 (24.0%) people had a bachelor's or higher degree, 120 (53.3%) had a post-high school certificate or diploma, and 48 (21.3%) people exclusively held high school qualifications. 27 people (12.0%) earned over $100,000 compared to 12.1% nationally. The employment status of those at least 15 was 132 (58.7%) full-time and 36 (16.0%) part-time.

=== Omihi statistical area ===
The Omihi statistical area, which also includes Waipara and Greta Valley, covers 717.90 km^{2} (277.18 sq mi). It had an estimated population of 1,280 as of June 2025, with a population density of 1.8 people per km^{2}.

Historical population for the statistical area
Year	Pop.	±% p.a.
2006	1,194	—
2013	1,197	+0.04%
2018	1,242	+0.74%
2023	1,269	+0.43%

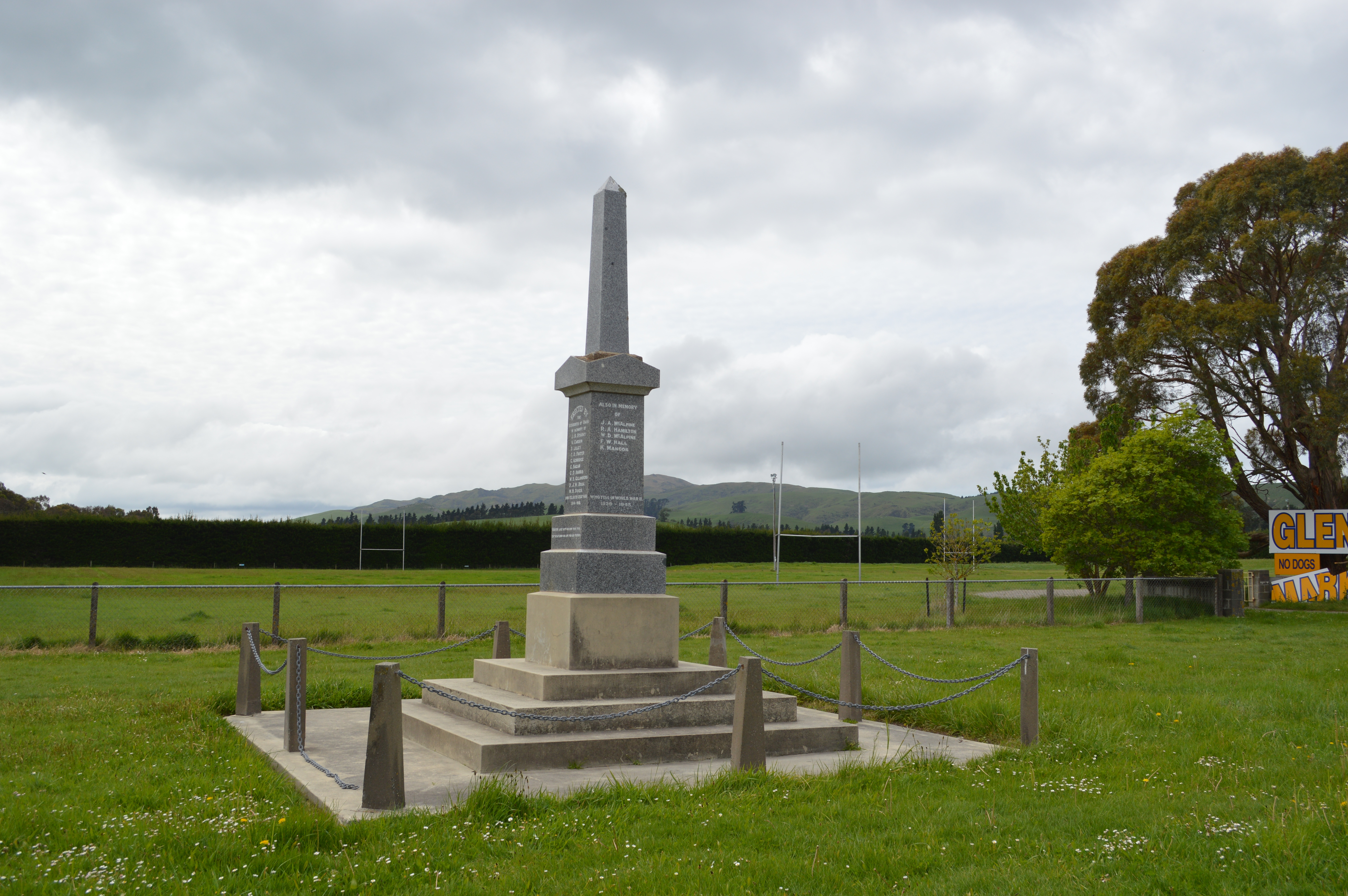
Omihi War Memorial

The statistical area had a population of 1,269 in the 2023 New Zealand census, an increase of 27 people (2.2%) since the 2018 census, and an increase of 72 people (6.0%) since the 2013 census. There were 675 males, 591 females, and 3 people of other genders in 543 dwellings. 1.9% of people identified as LGBTIQ+. The median age was 48.4 years (compared with 38.1 years nationally). There were 234 people (18.4%) aged under 15 years, 153 (12.1%) aged 15 to 29, 606 (47.8%) aged 30 to 64, and 273 (21.5%) aged 65 or older.

People could identify as more than one ethnicity. The results were 94.3% European (Pākehā); 9.0% Māori; 0.7% Pasifika; 1.2% Asian; 0.5% Middle Eastern, Latin American and African New Zealanders (MELAA); and 4.7% other, which includes people giving their ethnicity as "New Zealander". English was spoken by 98.1%, Māori by 2.4%, and other languages by 5.2%. No language could be spoken by 1.7% (e.g. too young to talk). New Zealand Sign Language was known by 0.7%. The percentage of people born overseas was 14.7, compared with 28.8% nationally.

Religious affiliations were 29.1% Christian, 0.2% Māori religious beliefs, 0.5% New Age, 0.2% Jewish, and 0.5% other religions. People who answered that they had no religion were 60.0%, and 9.5% of people did not answer the census question.

Of those at least 15 years old, 210 (20.3%) people had a bachelor's or higher degree, 594 (57.4%) had a post-high school certificate or diploma, and 231 (22.3%) people exclusively held high school qualifications. The median income was $38,800, compared with $41,500 nationally. 99 people (9.6%) earned over $100,000 compared to 12.1% nationally. The employment status of those at least 15 was 543 (52.5%) full-time, 213 (20.6%) part-time, and 12 (1.2%) unemployed.

== Education ==
Omihi School is a co-educational state primary school for Year 1 to 8 students, with a roll of 41 as of July 2026.

The school was founded in 1900 with a roll of 31 and one classroom. The school was expanded between 1906 and 1911, and moved to a new position on the same site in 1948. It currently has two classrooms, an office block, a school house, a library and a swimming pool.
