= Margrit Shildrick =

Interdisciplinary academic

Academic background
- Education: University of Sussex (BA); University of Liverpool (MSc, 1991); University of Warwick (PhD, 1994); Queen's University Belfast (PCHET, 2007)
- Thesis: Leaky Bodies and Boundaries. Feminism, Deconstruction and Bioethics (1994)
- Doctoral advisor: Christine Battersby and Hilary Graham

Margrit Shildrick is an academic in interdisciplinary gender studies whose research spans feminism, bioethics, and post-structuralism, among other fields of thought. Since 2018, she has served as a guest professor at Stockholm University.

== Education ==
Shildrick earned a Bachelor of Arts in English from the University of Sussex, a Master of Science in the ethics of health care from the University of Liverpool (1991), a Doctor of Philosophy in interdisciplinary studies from the University of Warwick (1994), and a Postgraduate Certificate in Higher Education and Teaching from Queen's University Belfast (2007).

== Career ==
Shildrick has lectured at Open University (1991-1994), the University of Warwick (1994), the University of Liverpool (1993-1995), Lancaster University (1994-1995; 1997-1998), the University of Leeds (1995-1996), Staffordshire University (1998-2001; 2001-2002), and Queen's University Belfast (2005-2011). From 2003 to 2004, Shildrick was a visiting professor and director of the critical disability studies program at York University, Toronto. From 2011 to 2017, she was a professor at Linköping University, after which she became a guest professor at Stockholm University, a position she continues to hold in January 2025.

Shildrick has held research fellowships at University College Dublin (2001-2004), Cornell University (2003), Macquarie University (2005), the University of Sydney (2005), the University of Toronto (2005-2007), Linköping University (2009), and Australian National University (2018); and Helsinki Collegium for Advanced Studies (2019).

== Books ==
=== Authored ===
- Leaky Bodies and Boundaries: Feminism, Postmodernism and (Bio)ethics. Routledge. 1997. ISBN 978-0-415-14616-6.
- Embodying the Monster: Encounters with the Vulnerable Self. Sage. 2002. ISBN 978-1-446-23635-2.
- Dangerous Discourses: Subjectivity, Sexuality and Disability. Palgrave Macmillan. 2009. ISBN 978-0-230-24464-1.
- Visceral Prostheses: Somatechnics and Posthuman Embodiment. Bloomsbury. 2023. ISBN 978-1-350-22494-0.

=== Edited ===
- Price, Janet; Shildrick, Margrit, eds. (1998). Vital Signs: Feminist Reconfigurations of the Bio/logical Body. Edinburgh University Press. ISBN 978-0-748-60963-5.
- Price, Janet; Shildrick, Margrit, eds. (1999). Feminist Theory and the Body: A Reader. Edinburgh University Press. ISBN 978-0-415-92566-2.
- Shildrick, Margrit; Mykitiuk, Roxanne, eds. (2005). Ethics of the Body: Postconventional Challenges. MIT Press. ISBN 978-0-262-69320-2.
- Shildrick, Margrit; Giffney, Noreen, eds. (2013). Theory on the Edge: Irish Studies and the Politics of Sexual Difference. Palgrave Macmillan. ISBN 978-1-137-31547-2.
