= Margareta Dockvil =

Swedish hatmaker

Margareta Dockvil (died after 1673), was a Swedish hatmaker. She played an important role in the guild conflict between the hat makers and hat ornament makers of Stockholm, and was the cause of an important reform.

She was married to the Elder Dockvil of the hatmaker's guild in Stockholm. When she was widowed, she inherited the guild privilege of her late spouse and continued his profession.

In August 1673, she was one of the four members of the Hat maker's Guild elected as spokesperson when the National Board of Trade summoned representatives of the two guilds of hatmaker's (hatmakare) and milliners (hattstofferare), which had long been involved in a conflict as their trades was similar: the hatmakare made the hats themselves, but the hattstofferare provided the materials, manufactured the ornaments of the hats, and had the privilege of selling parts of hats.

Margareta Dockvil played a big role in this conflict, when she complained to the National Board of Trade that the hattstofferare had impended her business by refusing to provide her with materials; she was granted dispensation to have her own workshop established to manufacture and apply ornaments to her hats and sell them, which was until then the privilege of the guild of the hattstofferare. This was a caused for conflict which led the National Board of Trade to summon the two guilds in August of that year. The conflict ended with a reform that allowed the hat makers to manufacture ornaments of hats for their own hats and to sell parts of hats, with reference to the Precedent of Dockvil. It was a severe blow to the Guild of Hattstofferare.

== See also ==
- Dorothea Hoffman
