= Märta Strömberg =

Swedish archaeologist and prehistorian

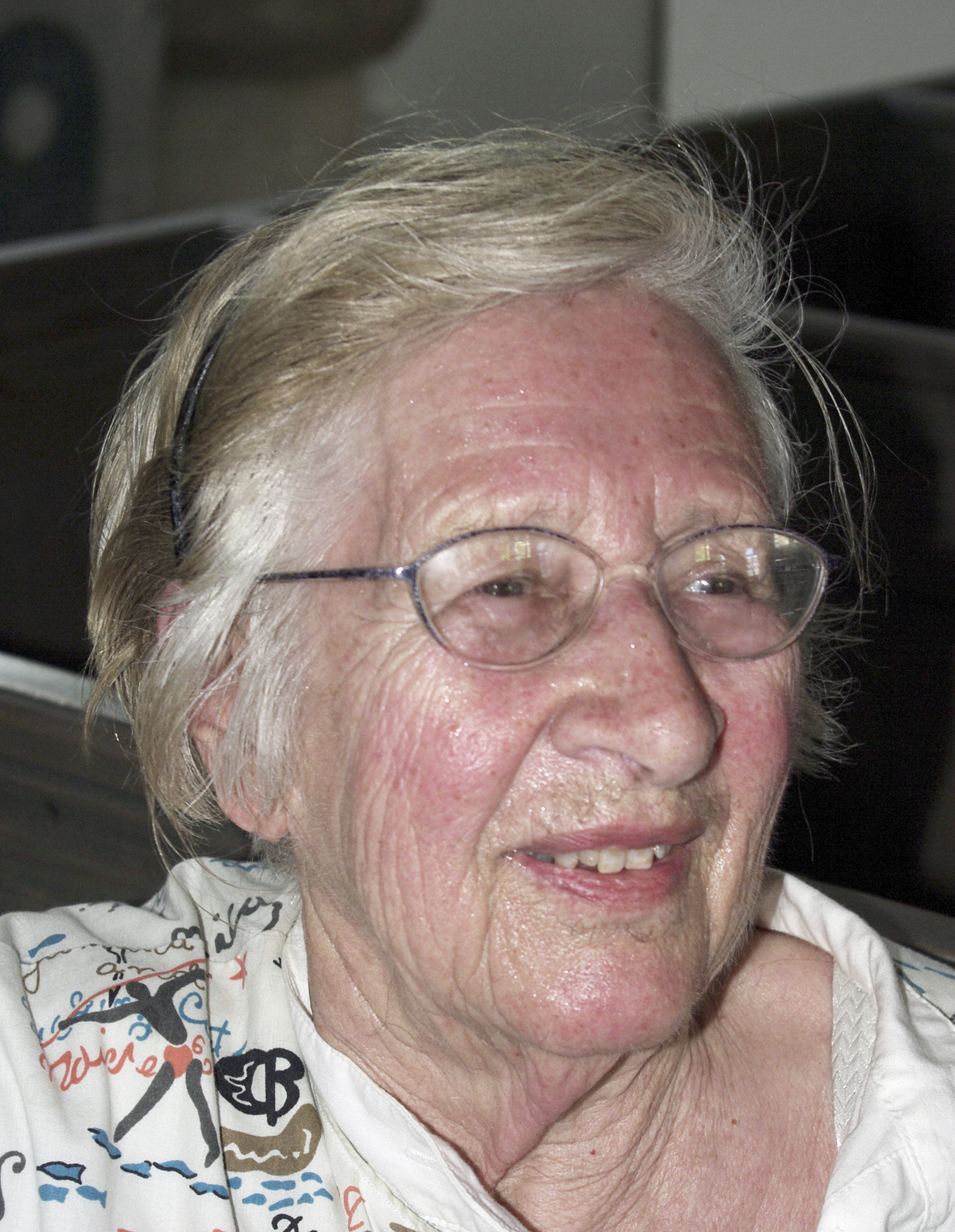
Märta Strömberg

Märta Strömberg (1921–2012) was a Swedish archaeologist.

== Life and work ==
Märta Strömberg was one of the first female archaeologists to enter the academic realm in Sweden. She began her career as a researcher at Lund University and stayed her entire professional career at the same university. She continued to work sporadically at the university also after her retirement. She has been described as one of the foremost experts in Nordic prehistory in Sweden, but had a broad base of knowledge and expertise stretching from knowledge about the Stone Age to the Middle Ages. Her research was based on a systems theory approach and focused on explaining social and economic structures by studying patterns of settlements in the landscape within a very long time frame.¨

== Published work in English ==
- Strömberg, Märta (2001). Ale's stones: a monument of recycled boulders?. Lund archaeological review. 2001(7), s. 77–87
- Strömberg, Märta (1984). Burial Traditions in Late Neolithic Society: Models and Results in the Hagestad Project. Meddelanden från Lunds universitets historiska museum. 1983-1984 s. 47–71
- Strömberg, Märta (1988). A Complex Hunting and Production Area: Problems associated with a Group of Neolithic Sites to the South of Hagestad. Meddelanden från Lunds universitets historiska museum. 1987-1988 s. 53–80
- Strömberg, Märta (1992). A concentration of houses from the Late Neolithic/Early Bronze Age at Hagestad. Meddelanden från Lunds universitets historiska museum. 1991-1992 s. 57–89
- Strömberg, Märta (1980). The Hagestad investigation: a project analysis. Meddelanden från Lunds universitets historiska museum. 1979-1980 s. 47–60
- Strömberg, Märta (1986). Signs of Mesolithic Occupation in South-East Scania. Meddelanden från Lunds universitets historiska museum. 1985-1986 s. 52–83
- Strömberg, Märta (1982). Specialized, Neolithic Flint Production: With a Hoard of Scrapers at Hagestad as an Example. Meddelanden från Lunds universitets historiska museum. 1981-1982 s. 48–64
- Strömberg, Märta (1978). Three neolithic sites: a local seriation?. Meddelanden från Lunds universitets historiska museum. 1977-1978 s. 68-97
