= Margaretta Mitchell =

American photographer and writer (born 1935)

Margaretta Mitchell (née Kuhlthau, born May 27, 1935) is an American photographer and writer who lives in Berkeley, California. As a photographer, she is known for her portraits and still lifes. She has authored art criticism, biographies of women artists, and photographic histories.

== Early life ==
Mitchell was born May 27, 1935, in Brooklyn, New York, the second child of Conrad W. and Margaretta Kuhlthau. After graduating magna cum laude in 1957 from Smith College, Mitchell (then Kuhlthau) served until 1959 as a research assistant to Edwin Land, who was instrumental in the invention of the Polaroid instant camera.

== Work ==
Mitchell’s photographs belong to the Pictorialist tradition, addressing formal concerns of line and shadow primarily in black and white. She occasionally incorporates graphic media, particularly in images of flowers. Her work can be found in the collections of the Amon Carter Museum of American Art, the International Center of Photography, the Akron Art Museum, and San Francisco Museum of Modern Art, among others.

In perhaps her best-known work, Mitchell worked with the International Center of Photography in New York City in the late 1970s to mount a traveling exhibition and accompanying book on women photographers. Recollections: Ten Women of Photography included works by Berenice Abbott, Ruth Bernhard, Carlotta Corpron, Louise Dahl-Wolfe, Nell Dorr, Toni Frissell, Laura Gilpin, Lotte Jacobi, Consuelo Kanaga, and Barbara Morgan, bringing attention to the previously overlooked contributions of women to photography.

Other publications include To a Cabin with Dorothea Lange (1973), Dance for Life (1985), Flowers (1991), a biography of photographer Ruth Bernhard (2000), and The Face of Poetry (2005).

== Personal life ==
She and Frederick Mitchell married on May 23, 1959, in New Brunswick, New Jersey. The couple raised three daughters. Frederick Mitchell died in 1996. In 2018 she married Sim Warkov.
