= Metta (given name) =

Metta is a given name. Notable people with the name include:

- Metta Fock (1765–1810), Swedish noble and sentenced murderer
- Metta Permadi (born 1989), Indonesian actress
- Metta Spencer (born 1931), Canadian sociologist
- Metta von Oberg (1737–1794), German baroness
- Metta Sandiford-Artest (born 1979), American basketball coach and former player

== See also ==
- LaMetta Wynn (1933–2021), U.S. politician
- Meta (name)
- Metta (disambiguation)
