= Inbar (name) =

- Gender: Female
- Language(s): Hebrew

Origin
- Meaning: Amber

Inbar (Hebrew: ענבר, sometimes Enbar), is a Hebrew surname and feminine given name meaning "amber" in Hebrew.

== Given name ==
- Inbar Bakal, Israeli singer-songwriter
- Inbar Lanir (born 2000), Israeli world champion and Olympic judoka
- Inbar Lavi (born 1986), Israeli actress
- Inbar Vinarsky (born 1991), Israeli female former volleyball player

== Surname ==
- Amit Inbar, Israeli Olympic competitive windsurfer
- Avital Inbar, Israeli author, translator, journalist, and restaurant critic
- Naama Goren-Inbar, Israeli archaeologist and paleoanthropologist
- Noam Enbar, Israeli singer, composer, songwriter, artistic director, music producer, band and choir leader, film and theater composer and teacher/mentor
- Hava Inbar, Holocaust survivor, Lieutenant Colonel of the Israeli Defense Forces
