= Giada Valenti =

Italian singer

- Born: Cristina; Portogruaro, Venezia, Italy
- Occupations: Singer, Songwriter
- Years active: 1995–present

Giada Valenti is an Italian singer, born in Portogruaro, near Venice. Valenti started singing and playing piano at age seven. She studied music theory and piano at Santa Cecilia and got her music degree at G. Tartini in Trieste.

Since 2005, Giada Valenti has been living in New York City. She performs regularly in various theatres, festivals, clubs and has also performed at the Columbus Day parade in New York City. In 2005 she self-released her first CD, Italian Signorina. Her second CD, And I Love You So, was released in 2008. In 2009 Valenti presented a new show, Tribute to love, at Hotel Hilton Casino & Resort, which was sold out. In 2010, Valenti performed in Broadway with a new show called An Evening with Giada Valenti, singing love songs of the 1960s, 1970s and 1980s.

Before moving to New York City Valenti got a job offer to sing in a trio in Switzerland. While she was in Amsterdam she was selected for a contest, the San Remo Giovani Talenti nel Mondo, a contest for Italian residents in foreign countries and she represented the Netherlands. She won with the song, Solo con te, in the songwriter's category. After that BMG Ariola Holland offered her a contract. She released her first CD in 2000 under her real name. She changed her name to Giada Valenti in 2005 when she moved to New York City. One of the singles from her CD, Cristina Parliamo d'amore, was selected for a scooter advertisement in the Netherlands and Belgium.

== Columbus Day Parade in New York City ==
Valenti performed as a singer on the red carpet of the annual Columbus Day Parade in New York City in 2005–2013 and again in 2022. Since 2022, she has served as a co-host for ABC7 during the three-hour live television broadcast of the parade.

== PBS Television Special ==
Valenti had her debut with PBS in September 2015 Her CD-DVD, From Venice With Love, was released in 2016 features top-notch production credits including arranger Chris Walden, Larry Gold, multi-Grammy Award-winning music producer Gregg Field, television director Alex Coletti, and lighting designer Chris Landy

== Carnegie Hall, New York ==
In October 2018, Giada Valenti performed in concert at Carnegie Hall in New York City in celebration of Hispanic and Italian Heritage Month. The program featured songs written, composed, or popularized by artists of Hispanic and Italian heritage, including Henry Mancini, Armando Manzanero, Dean Martin, Ennio Morricone, Consuelo Velázquez, Pino Donaggio, Violeta Parra, Gino Paoli, Domenico Modugno, Christina Perri, and Frankie Valli. The concert's musical director was Tedd Firth.

In October 2019, Valenti returned to Carnegie Hall with a similar program celebrating Hispanic and Italian Heritage Month. The musical director for this performance was Etienne Stadwijk.

== Time in a Bottle ==
In 2023, Giada Valenti released a cover of Jim Croce's song Time in a Bottle, featuring saxophonist Michael Lington. The track was recorded at United Studios in Los Angeles, with Cheche Alara (piano), Rodrigo Rios (drums), Nathan East (bass), Ramon Stagnaro (guitar), and Paulinho da Costa (percussion). The recording was engineered and mixed by Don Murray. The arrangement was by Cheche Alara, and the track was produced by Rodrigo Rios.

== Christmas Album ==
In 2022, she released the Christmas album Love Under the Christmas Tree. The album was recorded at Capitol Studios in Los Angeles and at Abbey Road Studios in London. It features accompaniment by the Royal Philharmonic Orchestra and includes duet performances with country music artists Vince Gill, Trace Adkins, and Johnny Reid.

== Discography ==
Studio and Live albums

- Italian Signorina – EP (2008) – EP – Label: Independent
- And I Love You So (2012) – Label: Independent
- My Lullaby (2014) – Label: Independent
- From Venice With Love – Live (2016) – Label: Independent
- Love Under The Christmas Tree (2023) – Label: PM Recordings

Singles

- Como La Flor (2017) – Label: Independent
- Gracias A La Vida (2018) – Label: Independent
- What Child Is This (2020) – Label: Independent
- Silent Night (2021) – Label: Independent
- Every Time (2022) – Label: Independent
- Il Respiro (2022) – Label: Independent
- A Te (2022) – Label: PM Recordings
- Winter Star (2022) – Label: PM Recordings
- Time In A Bottle (2023) – Label: PM Recordings – Featuring: Michael Lington
- Winter Star (2023) – Label: PM Recordings – Duet with Johnny Reid
- Astro Del Ceil (2023) – Label: PM Recordings – Duet with Trace Adkins
- Have Yourself A Merry Little Christmas (2022) – Label: PM Recordings – Featuring: Royal Philharmonic Orchestra
- Blue Christmas (2023) – Label: PM Recordings – Duet with Vince Gill
- Silent Night (2023) – Label: PM Recordings – Duet with Trace Adkins
- For The First Time (2024) – Label: PM Recordings
- Maria Sabes Tu (2024) – Label: PM Recordings
- Esta Navidad Eres Tu (2024) – Label: PM Recordings
- Giving (2024) – Label: PM Recordings – Featuring: Royal Philharmonic Orchestra
- Always Here (2025) – Label: Moraine Music Group – Duet with Tim Wilgers
