= Jorge José Emiliano dos Santos =

Brazilian football referee

- Dos Santos at Ipanema Beach in 1992.
- Born: 19 March 1954; Rio de Janeiro, Brazil
- Died: 21 January 1995 (aged 40)

International
Years	League	Role

Jorge José Emiliano dos Santos (19 March 1954 – 21 January 1995) also known by his nickname, Margarida (meaning Daisy, in English) was a Brazilian football referee, known for his flamboyant style. He is recognized as an iconic figure in Brazilian football and was one of the first openly gay referees in Brazil.

== Early life ==
Jorge José Emiliano dos Santos was born on 19 March 1954 in Rio de Janeiro. He was raised in Copacabana. He learned at the age of 13 to officiate football games from watching pick-up games on the beach. His childhood idol was Armando Marques.

== Career ==
After serving as a referee for lower level matches on the beach and in stadiums, dos Santos began refereeing bigger tournaments such as the 1988 Taça Guanabara. He was known for his "no-nonsense" style. He stated in an interview on 25 March 1988 with Placar that "I do not allow any type of indiscipline and demand respect." Due to this reputation, dos Santos was respected by footballers and other referees. In the 1980s, dos Santos, Válter "Bianca" Senra, Paulino Rodrigues da Silva, and Sérgio Cenedezi all faced scrutiny as the few openly gay referees of Brazil. In a 1988 match between Volta Redonda and Flamengo, dos Santos faced homophobic slurs from the crowd due to his perceived "effeminate physicality."

Dos Santos reflected in 1988:

“Good God! I’ve been hearing that for 20 years, why would I only now give it any weight?"

He added:

“I acknowledged my sexuality to a prejudiced country, which is a hard thing to do. Now if I happen to steal the show it’s because the game is boring.”

Luiz Mott and dos Santos met in the late 1980s while recording a segment for Canal Livre. Notably, dos Santos' childhood idol Armando Marques aimed to remove gay referees from the Brazilian Football Confederation. According to The Advocate dos Santos would tell players, "I might be a pansy off the pitch, but here I'm a macho man."

== Personal life and legacy ==
Dos Santos was one of the first openly gay referees in Brazil. He died on 21 January 1995 from AIDS-related complications. Two days later, he was buried in Cemitério de São João Batista wearing a black Brazilian Football Confederation shirt and flowers.

He is recognized as an iconic figure in Brazilian football. Dos Santos is one of three role models for the character Margarida from referee Clésio Moreira dos Santos on YouTube.
