= Margit Rösler =

German mathematician (born 1962)

Margit Rösler (born 1962) is a German mathematician known for her research in harmonic analysis, special functions, and Dunkl operators. She is a professor of mathematics at Paderborn University.

Rösler earned a diploma in mathematics with distinction from the Technical University of Munich in 1988. She completed her PhD at the same university in 1992. Her dissertation, Durch orthogonale trigonometrische Systeme auf dem Einheitskreis induzierte Faltungsstrukturen auf $\mathbb{Z}$, was jointly supervised by Rupert Lasser and Elmar Thoma.

She remained at the Technical University of Munich as a postdoctoral researcher and assistant professor, earning a habilitation in 1999. Her habilitation thesis was Contributions to the theory of Dunkl operators. She was a lecturer at the University of Göttingen from 2000 until 2004. Then, after short-term positions at the University of Amsterdam and Technische Universität Darmstadt, and a professorship at the Clausthal University of Technology, she took her present position at Paderborn University in 2012.
