= Märta Björnbom =

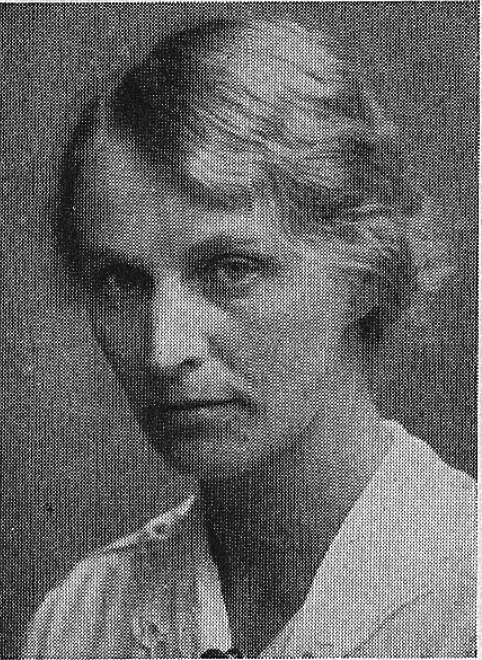
Märta Björnbom

Märta Björnbom (25 May 1888 in Stockholm – 14 July 1973 in Danderyd Municipality) was a Swedish lawyer. She was one of the first women in Sweden to complete a law degree in the early 20th century. She had worked in the law sphere, like being a notary, legal representative, an assistant to a lawyer, then later being involved in many associations; member of the International Law Association, chaired the Swedish Women's Citizens' Union, an apolitical association that worked to achieve gender equality and improve women's conditions.
