= Margit von Schoultz-Frankenhaeuser =

Swedish-speaking Finnish writer (1898–1990)

Margit Florence Maria Frankenhaeuser (born von Schoultz; 23 December 1898 in Kamianske, Russia - 21 July 1990 in Turku, Finland) was a Finnish journalist, librarian and poet who wrote in Swedish.

Frankenhaeuser's parents were the engineer Runo Georg Konstantin von Schoultz and Ingrid Elisabet Idestam. Margit Frankenhaeuser graduated from Nya svenska samskolan in 1917 and then studied history and linguistics at the University of Helsinki. She worked as a bank clerk from 1919 to 1927 and as a librarian in Hanko from 1951 to 1965. She also worked for the newspaper Hangötidningen-Hangonlehti from 1951 to 1971. In 1971 she moved to Turku, after which she worked for many years at the scriptwriting department at Åbo Akademi University. She also wrote theatre reviews from Turku for Hangötidningen-Hangonlehti.

Frankenhaeuser was a radio presenter for several years. She enthusiastically participated in association activities and supported Swedish-speaking scouts in Hanko. She was chairman of the coastal battery military home association for many years. Frankenhaeuser was also a member of the city council and the church council. She was interested in art, literature and music. She managed to publish two collections of poetry before her death, the first one in 1943. Frankenhaeuser spent her last years at the nursing home Hemmet in Turku.

Frankenhaeuser was married to Constantin Frankenhaeuser from 1927 to 1950. They had three children together. Margit Frankenhaeuser is buried in the Hietaniemi Cemetery in Helsinki.

== Bibliography ==
- Allenast detta: dikter. Bro, Turku, 1943
- Lysande skugga. Schildt, Helsinki, 1945
