= Greta =

Greta may refer to:

== Arts and entertainment ==
=== Film ===
- Greta (2018 film), a thriller film directed by Neil Jordan
- Greta (2020 film), a documentary film about activist Greta Thunberg

=== Music ===
- Greta (band), hard rock band
- Greta (song), a 2022 song by Gloria Groove

== Natural history ==
- Greta (genus), butterfly genus in the family Nymphalidae
  - Greta morgane (thick-tipped greta)
  - Greta oto (glasswing)

== People ==
- Greta (given name), including a list of people and characters with the name

== Places ==
- Greta, New South Wales, town in Australia
  - Greta railway station
  - Greta Army Camp, former Australian Army camp near the town of Greta
- Greta, Victoria, town in Australia

== Other uses ==
- Group of Experts on Action against Trafficking in Human Beings, abbreviated GRETA
- Hurricane Greta, name of several Atlantic storms
- River Greta (disambiguation), one of three UK rivers

== See also ==
- Georgia Regional Transportation Authority, abbreviated GRTA and pronounced "Greta"
- Greta Bridge, village in County Durham, England
- Greta Van Fleet, hard rock band
