= Clésio Moreira dos Santos =

Brazilian football referee

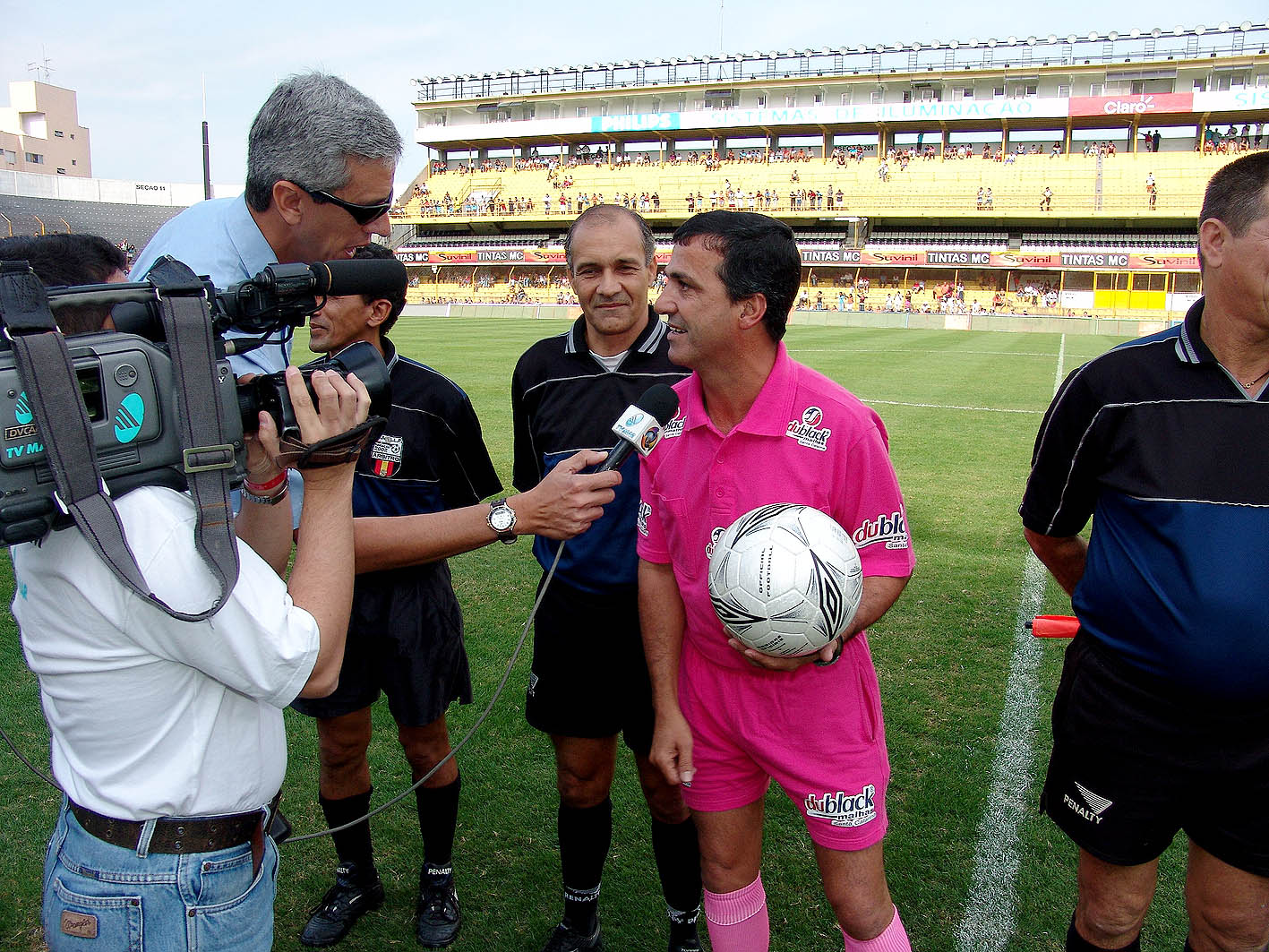
- Full name: Clésio Moreira dos Santos
- Born: 8 January 1958 (age 68); Palhoça, Santa Catarina, Brazil

Domestic
Years	League	Role
1988–2004	Campeonato Catarinense	Referee

Clésio Moreira dos Santos (born 8 January 1958), better known as Margarida (daisy), is a Brazilian football referee, known for his over-the-top style that made him famous on YouTube.

In 1988 his training as a referee started. In 1992, he had the idea to create an atypical referee persona. He developed his style until 1994, finding inspiration in the original Margarida Jorge José Emiliano dos Santos, Roberto Nunes Morgado, Alvir Renzi and Armando Marques. His trademarks are evocative movements and effeminate mannerisms. He started to wear pink shirts to add another dimension to his role and as an innovation for the visibility of the referee. Most of all, however, he wants to portray having fun in his role.

He started refereeing in his peculiar style in 1994 after a game in the second league of the Campeonato Catarinense de Futebol in the state of Santa Catarina. He was then hired for four games from a Florianópolis team against a Mexican team. The following year he was hired again. News items about him were broadcast until 2003 on several Brazilian networks. He traveled to 16 different countries.

His official career as a referee ended in 2004. He does still perform at amateur and charity games upon request. His day job is tourism manager in the city of Palhoça in the metropolis region Florianópolis. In 2008, he was a candidate for the city council.

Moreira dos Santos is married and has three children; one girl (born 1985) and two boys (born 1988 and 1993).
