= Margareta Hudig-Frey =

Swiss-Dutch art historian (1894 – after 1980)

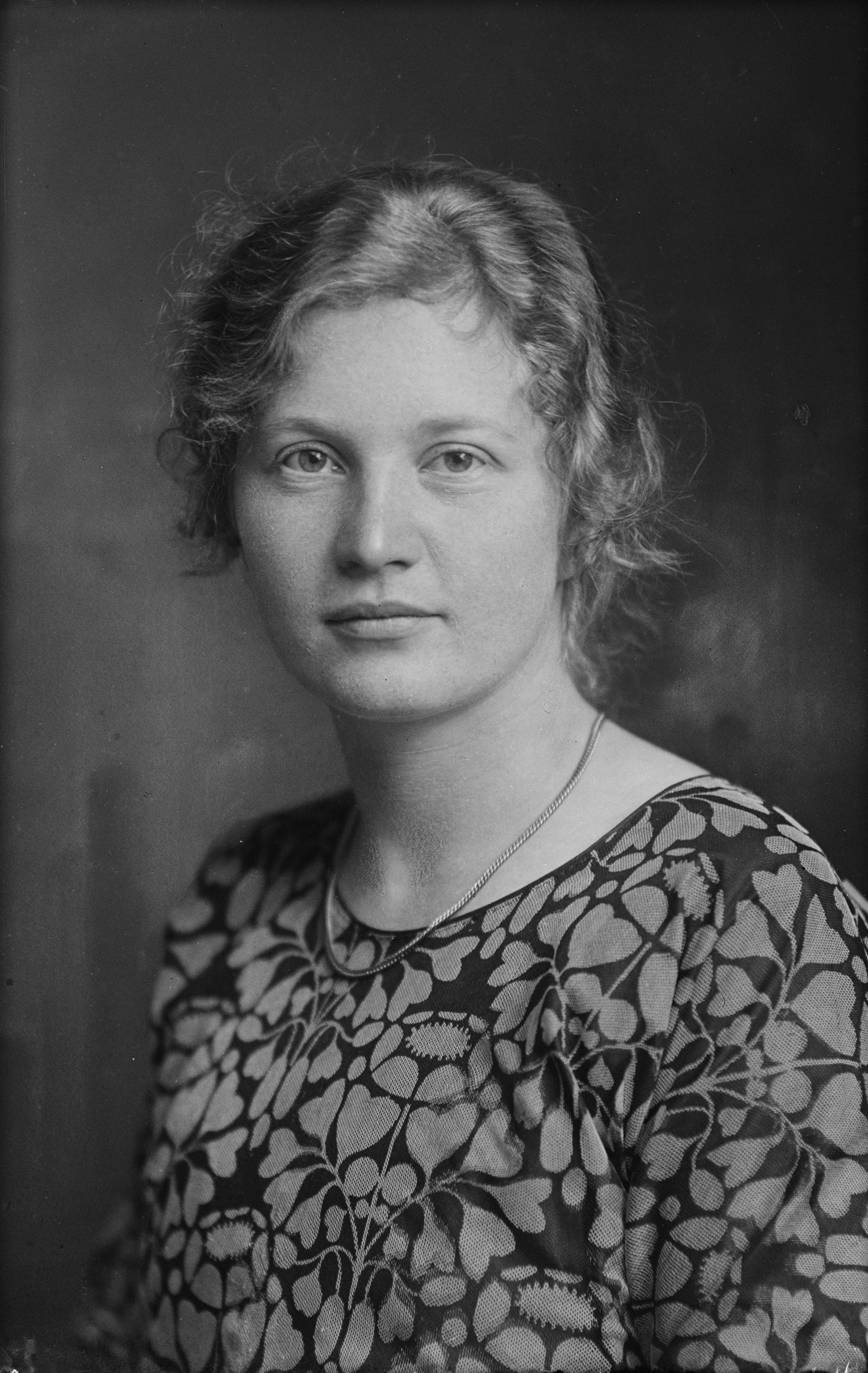
- Margareta Hudig-Frey, c.1925
- Born: 24 January 1894; Zurich
- Died: c.1981
- Education: PhD, University of Berlin
- Occupation: Art historian

Emma Josefine Margaretha Hudig-Frey (24 January 1894 in Zurich – c.1981) was a Swiss–Dutch art historian, poet, and author of historical studies.

== Life ==
In 1919, she completed her doctoral studies at Humboldt University of Berlin with a dissertation on the earliest illustrations found in the works of Heinrich von Veldeke. These illustrations, created in southern Germany during the first half of the thirteenth century, were preserved in a manuscript in Berlin.

She married Ferrand Whaley Hudig, an art historian and university lecturer, in Rotterdam. Margaretha Hudig-Frey subsequently worked as his assistant until his death in 1937.

== Selected publications ==
- Die älteste Illustration der Eneide des Heinrich von Veldeke, Straatsburg: Heitz, 1921.
- Ein Spiel von der Seele. Heitz, 1937.
- Die Botschaft von Inayat Khan, met Louis Hoyack, Komm. Bollmann AG., 1948.
- Lieder und Gesichte, Francke, 1949.
- Manzoni: Dichter, Denker, Patriot, Bern: Francke, 1958.
- Wandel und Wende: Gedichte, 1965.
- Locarno: Kleiner Kunst-und Reiseführer, Ed. Casagrande, 1972.
- Elena Bonzanigo nel ricordo di Margherita Hudig-Frey, 1975.
- Abschied Gedichte, 1981.
