= Margit =

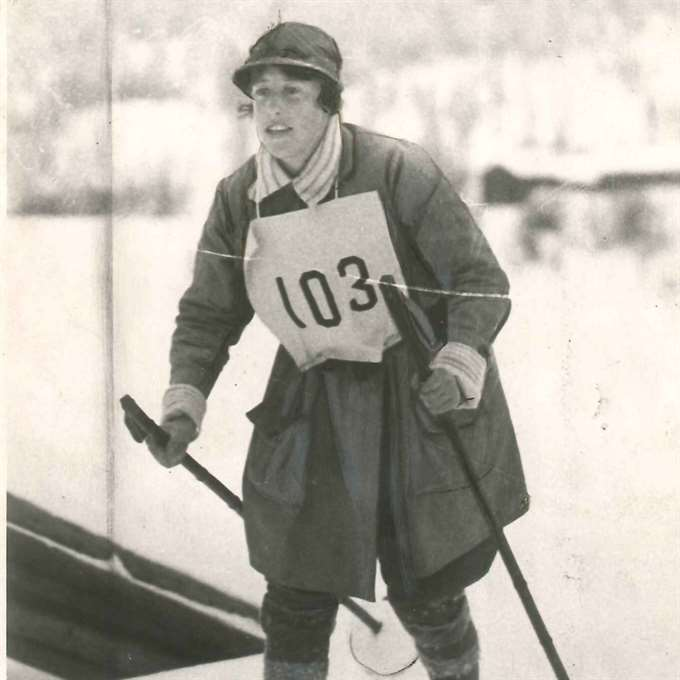
- Margit Nordin, fotograferad under Vasaloppet 1923.
- Gender: feminine
- Language: Hungarian
- Name day: June 10

Origin
- Language: Greek
- Meaning: "pearl"

Other names
- Variant form: Margaréta
- Cognate: Margaret
- Anglicisation: Margaret
- Related names: Rita, Margith, Marjit, Margjit

Margit is a feminine given name, a version of Margaret.

People bearing the name include:

- Margit of Hungary (1175–1223), Empress consort of Isaac II Angelos, Byzantine Emperor
- Saint Margit of Hungary (1242–1271), Hungarian nun and princess
- Margit Albrechtsson (1918–1994), Swedish cross country skier
- Margit Anna (1913–1991), Hungarian painter
- Margit Bangó (born 1950), Hungarian Romani singer and recipient of the Kossuth Prize
- Margit Bara (1928–2016), Hungarian actress
- Margit Beck (1918–1997), Hungarian-born American painter
- Margit Brandt (1945–2011), Danish fashion designer
- Margit Carlqvist (born 1932), Swedish actress
- Margit Carstensen (1940–2023), German actress
- Margit Dajka (1907–1986), Hungarian actress
- Margit Danÿ (1906–1975), Hungarian fencer
- Margit Elek (1910–1986), Hungarian fencer
- Margit Eskman (1925–1990), Finnish politician
- Margit Fischer (born 1943), First Lady of Austria, wife of President Heinz Fischer
- Margit Frenk (1925–2025), German-Mexican philologist, folklorist and translator
- Margit Graf (born 1951), Austrian luger
- Margit Gréczi (born 1941), Hungarian painter
- Margit Hansen-Krone (1925–?), Norwegian politician
- Margit Haslund (1885–1963), Norwegian women's advocate and politician
- Margit Hvammen (1932–2010), Norwegian alpine skier
- Margit Kaffka (1880–1918), Hungarian writer and poet
- Margit Korondi (1932–2022), Hungarian gymnast
- Margit Kovács (1902–1977), Hungarian ceramist and sculptor
- Margit Kristian (1913–2008), Yugoslavian fencer
- Margit Lukács (1914–2002), Hungarian actress
- Margit Makay (1891–1989), Hungarian actress
- Margit Müller (born 1952), German field hockey player
- Margit Mutso (born 1966), Estonian architect
- Margit Osterloh (born 1943), German engineer
- Margit Paar, German luger
- Margit Pörtner (born 1972), Danish curler
- Margit Rösler, German mathematician
- Margit Rüütel (born 1983), Estonian tennis player
- Margit Saad (1929–2023), German actress
- Margit Sandemo (1924–2018), Norwegian-Swedish writer
- Margit Schiøtt (1889–1946), Norwegian politician
- Margit von Schoultz-Frankenhaeuser (1898–1990), Swedish-speaking Finnish writer
- Margit Schumann (1952–2017), German luger
- Margit Senf (born 1945), German figure skater
- Margit Slachta (1884–1974), Hungarian religion activist
- Margit Sebők (1939–2000), Hungarian painter and educator
- Margit Sutrop (born 1963), Estonian philosopher, ethicist, academic, and politician
- Margit Tøsdal (1918–1993), Norwegian politician
- Margit Varga (1908–2005), American painter, art director, and journalist
- Margit Warburg (born 1952), Danish sociologist
- Margit Evelyn Newton, Italian actress
- Busk Margit Jonsson (born 1929), Swedish opera singer
- Gunn Margit Andreassen (born 1973), Norwegian biathlete
