= Madge Enterline =

American politician

Member of the Wyoming House of Representatives from the Natrona County district
- In office 1949–1953 Serving with Cecil Bon (1949–1951), J. R. Mitchell (1949–1951), Robert R. Rose Jr. (1949–1951), Howard J. Leik (1951–1953), Clark Perry (1951–1953), George H. Snodgrass (1951–1953), William F. Swanton (1951–1953)

Personal details
- Party: Republican
- Occupation: Politician

Madge Enterline was an American politician from Casper, Wyoming, who served in the Wyoming House of Representatives from 1949 to 1953, (Note: According to the Wyoming Legislature, Enterline served from 1949 to 1951.) representing Natrona County as a Republican in the 30th and 31st Wyoming Legislatures.

Enterline, along with representative Frank Mockler from Fremont County, introduced a bill known as the "Woman Jury Bill", which was supported by many women's organizations throughout the state. The bill was signed by governor Arthur G. Crane on February 19, 1949, and went into effect on January 1, 1950. The bill stated that anyone would be allowed to serve as a juror, provided they were a United States citizen, state and county resident, owner of taxable property, and fluent in English.

== Notes ==
Wyoming House of Representatives
Preceded by —	Member of the Wyoming House of Representatives from the Natrona County district 1949–1953; Served alongside: Cecil Bon (1949–1951), J. R. Mitchell (1949–1951), Robert R. Rose Jr. (1949–1951), Howard J. Leik (1951–1953), Clark Perry (1951–1953), George H. Snodgrass (1951–1953), William F. Swanton (1951–1953)	Succeeded by —
