= Margarida =

Margarida is a Portuguese and Catalan female given name, which is a variant of the name Margaret, and which also means "daisy flower" in Portuguese and Catalan .

The given name may refer to:

- Margarida Cabral de Melo (1570–1631), Portuguese noblewoman
- Margarida Corceiro (born 2002), Portuguese model and actress
- Margarida Cordeiro (born 1938), Portuguese film director
- Margarida Gironella (1886–1964), Catalan anarchist
- Margarida Teresa da Silva e Orta (1711–1793), Brazilian author
- Margarida de Abreu (1915–2006), Portuguese choreographer
- Margarida de Prades (1390–1430) Catalan queen, consort of Martí l'Humà
- Margarida Marante (1959–2012), Portuguese journalist
- Margarida Mapanzene, Mozambican politician
- Margarida Moura (born 1993), Portuguese tennis player
- Margarida Penha-Lopes (born 1964), Portuguese Historical Sciences professor
- Margarida Vila-Nova (born 1983), Portuguese actress
- Margarida Xirgu (1888–1969), Catalan actress
- Margarida Zelle (1876–1917), Dutch dancer and spy known as Mata Hari
- Jorge José Emiliano dos Santos (1954–1995), Brazilian football referee known as Margarida
- Clésio Moreira dos Santos (born 1958), Brazilian football referee known as Margarida
