= Margareta =

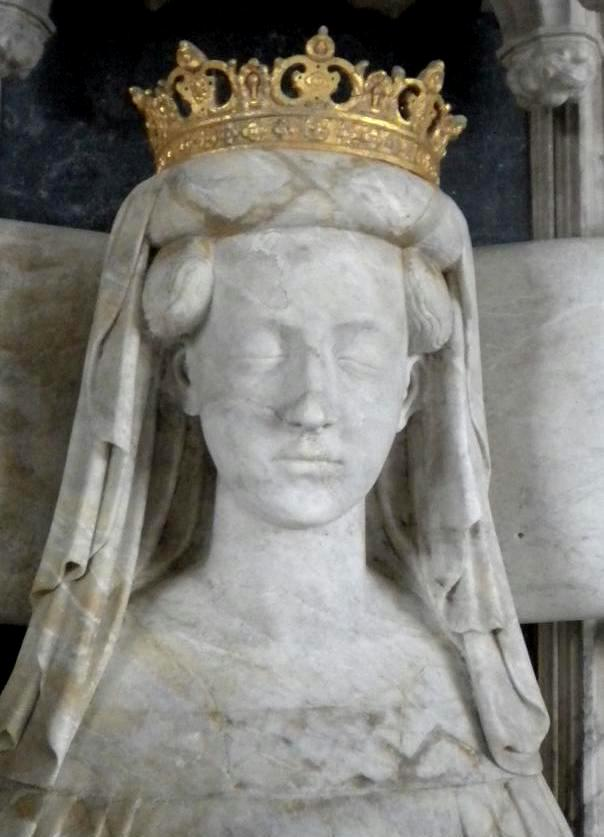

Margareta is a female given name mainly used by Germans, Austrians, Romanians, Swedes, and others. It derives from Latin, where it came from the Greek word margaritari (μαργαριτάρι), meaning pearl, which was borrowed from the Persians. It is cognate with Margaret, Marguerite, and Margarita.

People with the name include:

- Margareta (missionary) (c. 1369–c. 1425), Swedish missionary
- Margareta of Romania (born 1949), Crown-Princess of Romania
- Maya Ackerman, Russian-American computer scientist
- Margareta Alströmer (1763–1816), Swedish artist
- Margareta Andersson (born 1948), Swedish politician
- Margareta Bengtson (born 1966), Swedish soprano
- Margareta Brahe (1603–1669), Swedish lady-in-waiting
- Margareta Capsia (1682–1759), Finnish artist
- Margareta Cederfelt (born 1959), Swedish politician
- Margareta Cederschiöld, Swedish tennis player
- Margareta Dockvil (died after 1673), Swedish hatmaker
- Margareta Hudig-Frey (1894 – after 1980), Swiss-Dutch art historian
- Margareta Huitfeldt (1608–1683), Norwegian-Swedish land owner and philanthropist
- Margareta Kozuch (born 1986), German volleyball player
- Margareta Pogonat (1933–2014), Romanian actress
- Margareta Priolo (1890–1955), Occitan writer, singer, teacher
- Margareta Suber (1892–1984), Swedish writer
- Margareta Webber (1891–1983), Australian Bookseller

== See also ==
- Greta (disambiguation)
- Margaret (disambiguation)
- Margaretha
- Margaretta (given name)
- Margarita (disambiguation)
