= Amethyst (given name) =

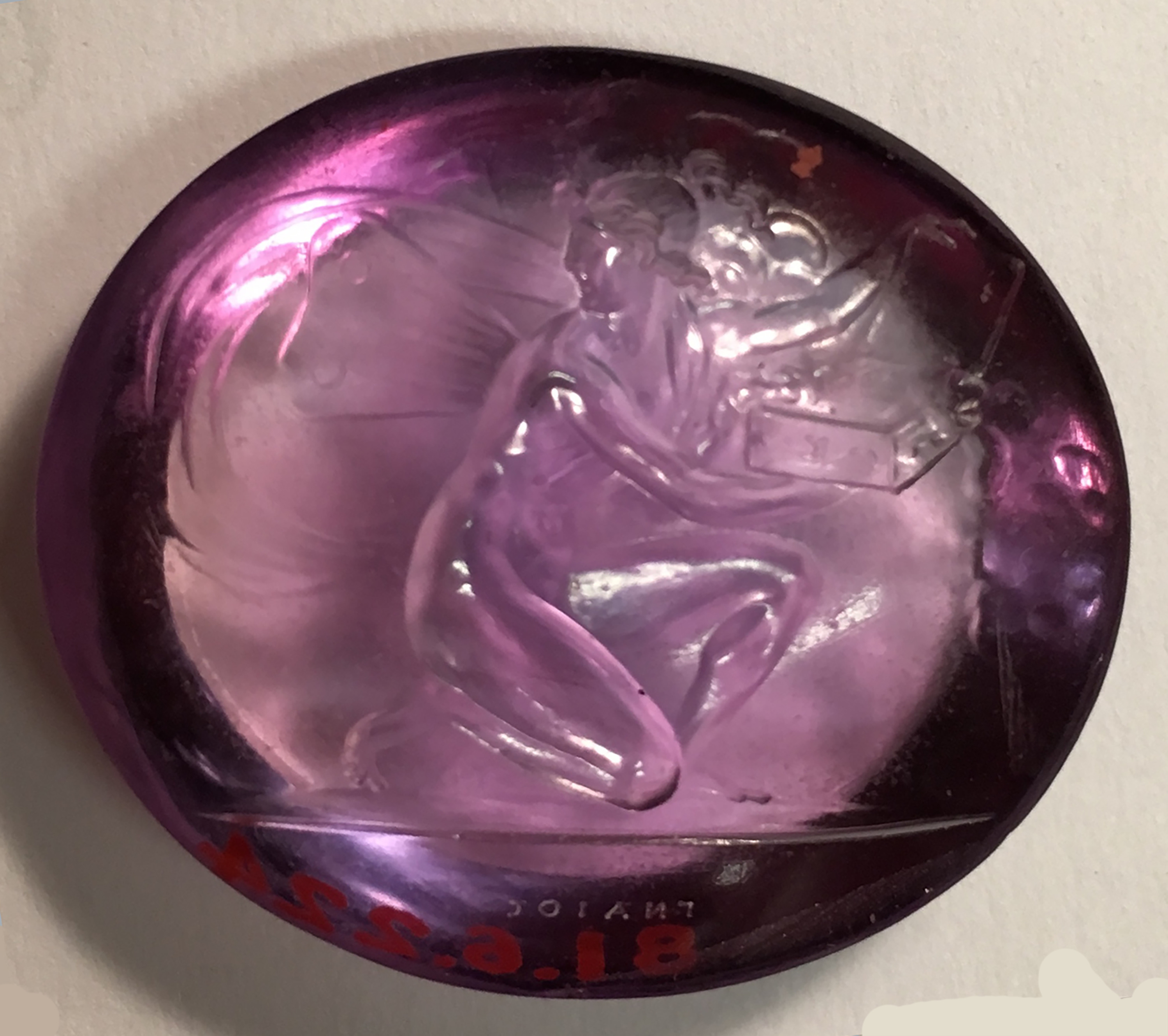
- An amethyst ring stone. The name is taken from the name for the semi-precious quartz used to make jewelry such as the birthstone for February.
- Gender: Primarily female
- Language: Greek

Origin
- Meaning: Amethyst

Amethyst is a given name derived from a semi-precious violet variety of quartz that is also used to make jewelry. Ancient Greeks believed the stone prevented intoxication. An amethyst is also the birthstone for people born in February.

The name may refer to:

== Females ==
- Amethyst Amelia Kelly, Australian recording artist known by the stage name Iggy Azalea (born 1990)

== Males ==
- Amethyst Bradley Ralani (born 1987), South African football player who plays for the Mamelodi Sundowns in the Premier Soccer League
