= Meta (name) =

Surname and female given name

Meta is both a surname and a female given name.

Notable people with the name include:

== Surname ==
- Beqir Meta (born 1957), Albanian historian
- Gjergj Meta (born 1976), Albanian Roman Catholic bishop
- Ilir Meta (born 1969), Albanian politician, president (2017–2022)
- Kenichiro Meta (born 1982), Japanese footballer
- Ermal Meta (born 1981), Italian singer-songwriter

== Given name ==
- Meta Brevoort (1825–1876), American mountain climber
- Meta Davis Cumberbatch (1900–1978), Bahamian activist, pianist and poet
- Meta Elste-Neumann (1919–2010), German-American gymnast
- Meta Vaux Warrick Fuller (1877–1968), American painter, poet and sculptor
- Meta Given (1888–1981), American nutritionist and cookbook writer
- Meta Golding (born 1971), American actress and figure skater
- Meta Heusser-Schweizer (1797–1876), Swiss poet
- Meta Luts (1905–1958), Estonian actress
- Meta Mayne Reid (1905–1991), Northern Irish children's writer
- Meta Orred (1845/1846–1925), Scottish writer
- Meta Ramsay, Baroness Ramsay of Cartvale (1936–2026), British politician, diplomat and spy
- Meta Seinemeyer (1895–1929), German opera singer
- Margaret Tuke (1862–1947), British academic and educator
- Meta Vannas (1924–2003), Soviet Estonian politician
- Meta Vidmar (1899–1975), Slovene dancer

== See also ==
- Metta (given name)
