= Greta (given name) =

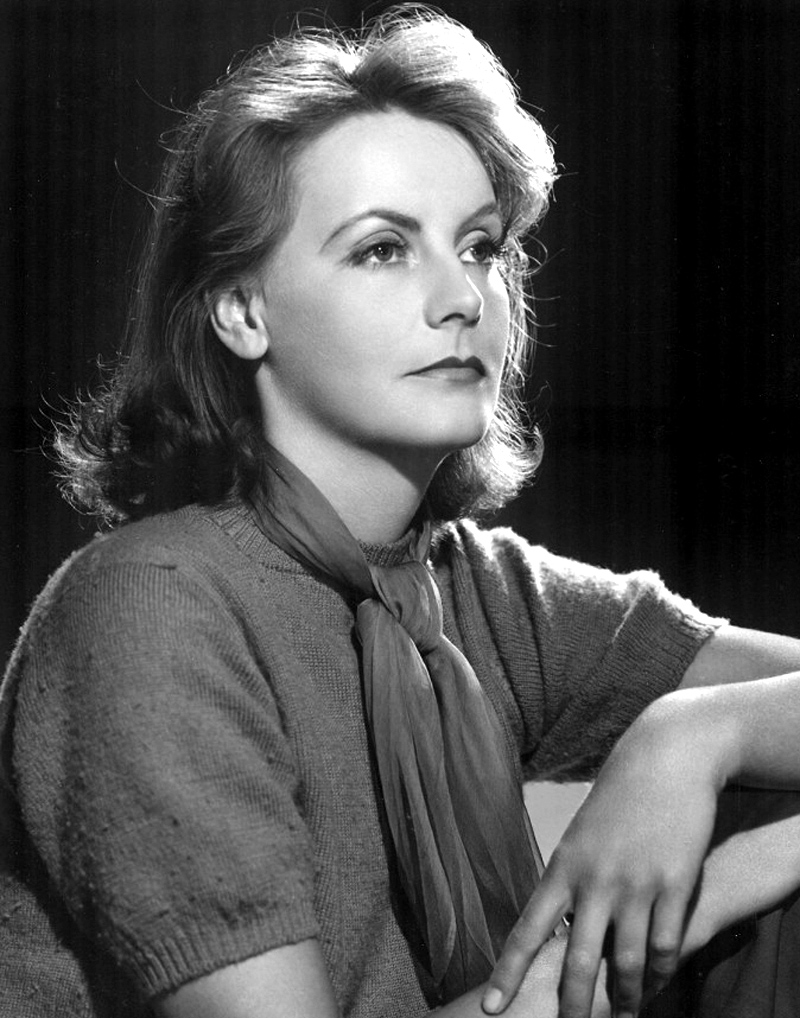
Greta Garbo

The name Greta is derived from the name Margareta, which comes from the Greek word margarites or "pearl".

Notable people with the name include:

- Greta Almroth (1888–1981), Swedish actress
- Greta Andersen (1927–2023), Danish swimmer
- Gréta Arn (born 1979), Hungarian tennis player
- Greta Svabo Bech (born 1987), Faroese singer
- Greta Bösel (1908–1947), German Nazi concentration camp guard and nurse executed for war crimes
- Greta Chi, Danish actress
- Greta Christina (born 1961), American atheist author and activist
- Greta Cicolari (born 1981), Italian beach volleyball player
- Greta Duréel (died 1696), Swedish fraud
- Greta Espinoza (born 1995), Mexican footballer
- Greta Garbo (1905–1990), Swedish-American actress
- Greta Gerwig (born 1983), American actress and filmmaker
- Gréta Gregorová (born 2001), Slovak politician
- Greta Grönholm (1923–2015), Finnish canoeist
- Greta Gynt (1916–2000), Norwegian singer, dancer and actress
- Greta Hällfors-Sipilä (1899–1974), Finnish painter
- Greta Hodgkinson (born 1973), American-Canadian ballet dancer
- Grethe Hjort (1903–1967), Danish writer and professor of Danish and English literature
- Greta Johansson (1895–1978), Swedish diver and swimmer
- Greta Johnson (born 1977), American lawyer and politician
- Greta Kempton (1901–1991), American painter
- Gréta Kerekes (born 1992), Hungarian hurdler
- Greta Kline, (born 1994), American musician
- Greta Knutson (1899–1983), Swedish artist, poet and critic
- Greta Lee (born 1983), American actress
- Greta M. Ljung (1941–2024), Finnish-American statistician
- Greta Magnusson-Grossman (1906–1999), Swedish designer and architect
- Greta Mikalauskytė, Lithuanian beauty pageant contestant
- Greta Molander (1908–2002), Swedish-Norwegian rally driver and writer
- Greta Morkytė (born 1999), Lithuanian figure skater
- Greta N. Morris (born 1947), American diplomat
- Greta Naterberg (1772–1818), Swedish folk singer
- Greta Neimanas (born 1988), American Paralympic cyclist
- Greta Nissen (1906–1988), Norwegian-American actress
- Greta Pavilonyte (born 2009), American rhythmic gymnast
- Greta Podleski, Canadian chef, author and television host
- Greta De Reyghere, Belgian soprano
- Greta Richioud (born 1996), French cyclist
- Greta Scacchi (born 1960), Italian-Australian actress
- Greta Schröder (1891–1980), German actress
- Greta Salpeter (born 1988), American singer
- Greta Skogster (1900–1994), Finnish textile artist
- Greta Salóme Stefánsdóttir (born 1986), Icelandic singer and violinist
- Greta Mjöll Samúelsdóttir (born 1987), Icelandic singer and footballer
- Greta Schiller (born 1954), American film director
- Greta Small (born 1995), Australian alpine skier
- Greta Stevenson (1911–1990), New Zealand botanist and mycologist
- Gréta Szakmáry (born 1991), Hungarian volleyball player
- Greta Thunberg (born 2003), political activist from Sweden
- Greta Thyssen (1927–2018), Danish-American actress
- Greta Vaillant (1942–2000), French actress
- Greta Van Susteren (born 1954), American television journalist
- Greta Wrage von Pustau (1902–1989), German dancer

== Fictional characters ==
- Greta (Chuck), one of several characters on Chuck
- Greta O'Donnell, main character from the movie According to Greta played by Hilary Duff
- Greta Hideg, character from the movie Greta (2018 film) played by Isabelle Huppert
- Greta Ohlsson, character from Murder on the Orient Express
