= Margaretta (given name) =

Margaretta is a feminine given name. It derives from Latin, where it came from the Greek word margaritari (μαργαριτάρι), meaning pearl, which was borrowed from the Persians. It is cognate with Margaret, Marguerite, and Margarita.

Notable people with the name include:

- Margaretta Brucker (1883–1958), American fiction author
- Margaretta Higford Burr, also known as Anne-Margaretta Burr (1817–1892), English watercolour painter
- Margaretta Parker Cox, née Blair (fl. 1910s–1950s), second wife of politician James M. Cox and First Lady of Ohio
- Margaretta Craig (1902–1963), American nurse and a missionary
- Margaretta D'Arcy (1934–2025), Irish actress, writer, playwright, and activist
- Margaretta Dressler, née Park (f. 1890s), wife of William F. Dressler
- Margaretta Eagar (1863–1936), Irish woman who was a nanny to the daughters of the Emperor and Empress of Russia
- Margaretta Faugères (1771–1801), American playwright, poet, and political activist
- Margaretta Finch-Hatton, Countess of Winchilsea (1885–1952), American heiress
- Margaretta Forten (1806–1875), African-American suffragist and abolitionist
- Margaretta Foster, 1st Viscountess Ferrard (c. 1737–1824), Anglo-Irish peeress
- Margaretta Graddon (born 1804), British popular singer
- Margaretta Groark (fl. 2000s), The Amazing Race contestant
- Margaretta Hicks (fl. 1880s–1910s), British socialist activist
- Margaretta S. Hinchman (1876–1955), American artist, illustrator, photographer, and sculptor
- Margaretta Elizabeth La Mott (fl. 1820s), wife of Alfred V. du Pont
- Margaretta "Etta" Lemon (1860–1953), English bird conservationist and a founding member of the Royal Society for the Protection of Birds
- Margaretta M. Lovell (fl. 1980s–2020s), American art historian
- Margaretta Mitchell (born 1935), American photographer and writer
- Margaretta Morris (1797–1867), American entomologist
- Margaretta Palmer (1862–1924), American astronomer, one of the first women to earn a doctorate in astronomy
- Margaretta Angelica Peale (1795–1882), American painter
- Margaretta Riley (1804–1899), English botanist
- Margaretta "Happy" Rockefeller, née Fitler (1926–2015), philanthropist and wife of vice president Nelson Rockefeller
- Margaretta Salinger (1907–1985), American art historian and curator
- Margaretta Schwartz (fl. 1870s), one of the first distinguished female performers in Yiddish theater
- Margaretta Scott (1912–2005), English stage, screen and television actress
- Margaretta Taylor (born 1942), American billionaire heiress
- Margaretta Tuttle (1875–1958), American writer
- Margaretta Wade Campbell, birth name of Margaret Deland (1857–1945), American novelist, short story writer, and poet
- Margaretta Sully West (d. 1810), American stage actress and theater director

== See also ==
- Margretta Dietrich, American suffragette and activist
- Margretta Styles (1930–2005), American nurse, author, educator and nursing school dean
- Margareta
- Margarita (given name)
- Margaretta (disambiguation)
