= Waikari River (Canterbury) =

Coordinates: 42°52′41″S 173°2′33″E

Location
- Country: New Zealand

Physical characteristics
- Mouth
  - location: Hurunui River
  - elevation: 80 m (260 ft)
- Length: 41 km (25 mi)

The Waikari River is a river of the northern Canterbury region of New Zealand's South Island. It flows generally east through a broad strath from its sources south of Hawarden, gradually veering northeast to reach the Hurunui 20 kilometres (12 mi) southwest of Cheviot. The name Waikari comes from the Māori word wai meaning "water" and kari meaning "dig".

== See also ==
- List of rivers of New Zealand
