= Margrethe =

Margret(h)e is an alternate spelling of the feminine given name Margaret.

People so named include:

- Margrete or Margaret I of Denmark (1353–1412), Queen of Denmark and Queen of Norway and Sweden by marriage
- Margrethe II of Denmark (born 1940), queen regnant of Denmark from 1972 to 2024
- Margaret of Sweden, Queen of Norway (c. 1155–1209), in Norwegian "Margrete", queen consort of Norway
- Margaret Skulesdatter (1208–1270), in Old Norse "Margrét", queen consort of Haakon IV of Norway
- Princess Margaret of Denmark (1895–1992), in Danish "Margrethe"
- Margrete Auken (born 1945), Danish politician
- Margrete Aamot Øverland (1913–1978), journalist and member of the Norwegian Resistance during World War II
- Margrethe Christiansen (1895–1971), Danish folk high school teacher
- Margrethe Lasson (1659–1758), first novelist in Denmark
- Margrethe Munthe (1860–1931), Norwegian teacher, children's writer, songwriter and playwright
- Margrethe Schall (1775–1852), Danish ballerina
- Margrethe Schanne (1921–2014), Danish ballerina
- Margrethe Vestager (born 1968), Danish politician
- Margrethe Blossom Dearie (April 28, 1924 – February 7, 2009), American jazz singer and pianist, better known as Blossom Dearie

== See also ==
- Margherita of Savoy (1851 - 1926), Queen of Italy
- Margaret of Scotland, Queen of Norway (1261 - 1283), in Old Norse "Margrét", queen consort of Norway
- Margaret Fredkulla (1080s - 1130), in Danish "Margrete", queen consort of Denmark and Norway
- Margaret Sambiria (1230? - 1282), in Danish "Margrethe", queen consort of Christoper I of Denmark and regent for Eric V of Denmark
