= Mette =

- Pronunciation: Danish: [ˈmetə]
- Gender: Female

Origin
- Meaning: Pearl
- Region of origin: Scandinavia

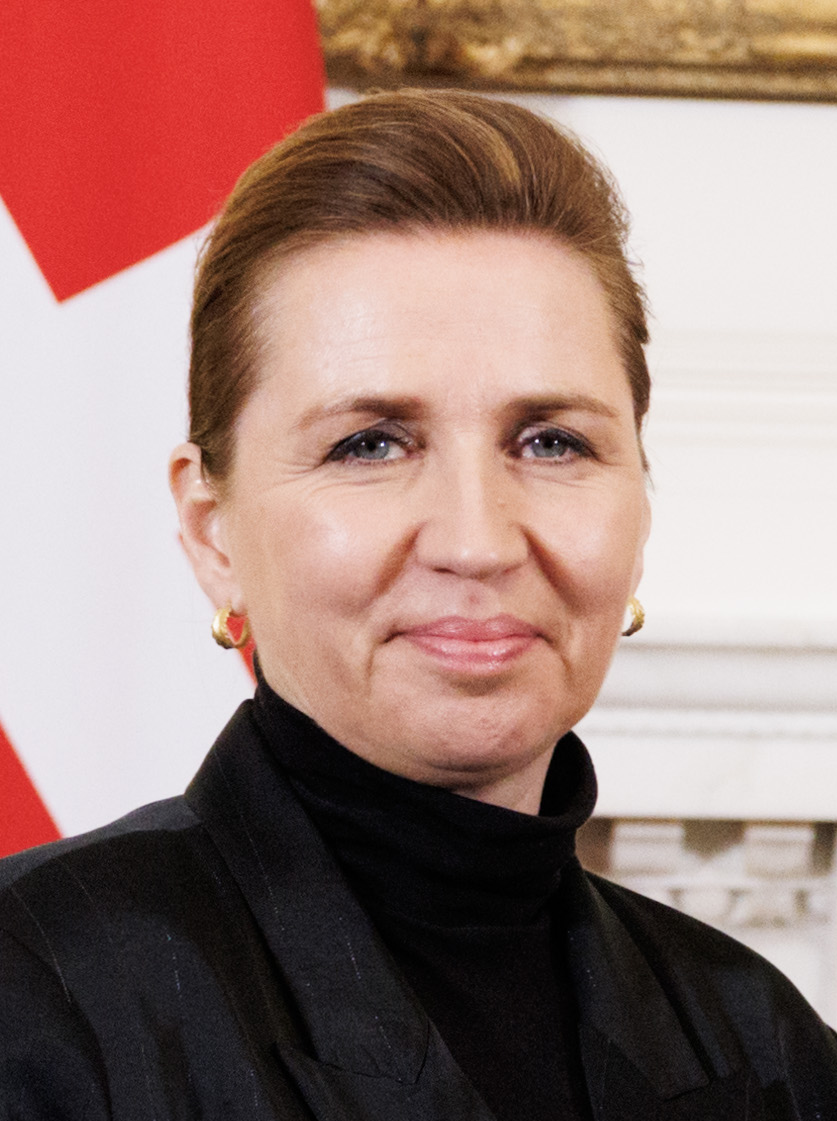
Danish Prime Minister Mette Frederiksen in 2025

Mette is a female given name of Scandinavian origin. It is descended from the name Margaret and is also considered a variant of Matilda.

== Notable people ==
- Mette Abildgaard (born 1988), Danish politician
- Mette Andersen (born 1974), Danish cyclist
- Mette Marie Andersen (born 1962), birth name of Saliha Marie Fetteh, Danish writer, lecturer and imam
- Mette Marie Astrup (1760–1834), Danish actress
- Mette Bergmann (born 1962), Norwegian discus thrower
- Mette Bull (1876–1946), Norwegian actress
- Mette Koefoed Bjørnsen (1920–2008), Danish author, conciliator and economist
- Mette Frederiksen (born 1977), Danish Prime Minister
- Mette Gøye (1599–1664), Danish noblewoman, writer, and translator
- Mette Hardenberg (1569–1629), Alleged Danish demonic possession victim
- Mette Henriette, Norwegian performing artist and composer
- Mette Jacobsen (born 1973), Danish swimmer
- Mette Lindberg (born 1983), vocalist for Danish psychedelic pop band The Asteroids Galaxy Tour
- Mette Madsen (1924–2015), Danish politician and writer
- Mette-Marit (born 1973), Queen of Norway
- Mette Oxvang (born 1937), Danish high jumper
- Mette Pedersen (born 1973), Danish badminton player
- Mette Reissmann (born 1963), Danish politician
- Mette Schjoldager (born 1977), Danish badminton player
- Mette Sørensen (born 1975), Danish badminton player
- Mette Thiesen (born 1981), Danish politician
- Mette Thomsen (born 1970), Danish novelist
- Mette Towley (born 1991), American singer, actress and dancer
- Mette Tranborg (born 1996), Danish handball player
- Mette Veiseth, Norwegian model, Miss Norway in 1987
- Mette Warburg (1926 - 2015), Danish eye specialist
- Mette Winge (1937–2022), Danish literary critic
- Stella De Mette (1891–1989), American contralto opera singer
