= Madge (given name) =

Madge is a female given name, a short form of Margaret, Marjorie, and Maggie. Madge may refer to:

Actresses:

- Madge Bellamy (1899–1990), American movie actress born Margaret Derden Philpott
- Madge Blake (1899–1969), American character actress most famous for her role as Aunt Harriet Cooper on the TV series Batman
- Madge Brindley (1901–1968), British actress
- Madge Elliott (1896–1955), Australian dancer and actress
- Madge Evans (born Margherita Evans; 1909–1981), American film actress who began her career as a child actress and model
- Madge Hindle (born 1938), English actress
- Dame Madge Kendal (1848–1935), English actress and theatre manager
- Madge Kennedy (1891–1987), American actress
- Madge Kirby (1884–1956), English-born American actress
- Madge Lessing (1873–1966), English singer and actress
- Madge Meredith (1921–2017), American actress
- Madge Ryan (1919–1994), Australian actress
- Madge Sinclair (1938–1995), Jamaican-born American actress
- Madge Skelly, American actress and audiologist
- Madge Stuart (1895–1958), British silent film actress
- Madge Titheradge (1887–1961), Australian actress
- Madge Tree (1875–1947), British actress
- Madge Tyrone, American actress, film editor and screenwriter

Politics:

- Madge Biggs (1902–1985), Falkland Islands librarian and politician
- Madge Bradley (1904–2000), American judge
- Madge Enterline, American politician

Singers:

- Madonna, American singer and actress, known as "Madge" in the British press.

Sports:

- Madge Allan, English lawn bowler
- Madge Moulton (1917–?), British diver
- Madge Rainey, Irish camogie player
- Madge Stewart, Jamaican cricketer
- Madge Syers (born Florence Madeline Syers; 1881–1917), British figure skater, first woman to compete at the World Figure Skating Championships

Writers:

- Madge Jenison (1874–1960), American novelist
- Madge Morris Wagner (1862–1924), American poet and journalist

In other fields:

- Madge Adam (1912–2001), English astronomer
- Madge Easton Anderson (1896–1992), Scottish lawyer
- Madge Bester (1963–2018), formerly the world's shortest living woman
- Madge Connor (1874–1952), female police officer
- Madge Dawson, American educator, social worker, researcher and pioneering feminist
- Madge Dresser, English historian
- Madge Elder, Scottish gardener, writer and feminist
- Madge Gill (1882–1961), English outsider and visionary artist
- Madge Miller Green (1900–1989), American politician and educator
- Madge Knight (1895–1974), English artist
- Madge Macklin (1893–1962), American physician
- Madge Moore (1922–2016), American aviator
- Madge Oberholtzer (1896–1925), American woman raped and murdered by the Grand Dragon of the Indiana Klan
- Madge Oliver (1875–1924), British artist
- Madge Smith (1898–1974), Canadian photographer
- Madge Tennent (1889–1972), British-American painter considered the greatest individual contributor to 20th-century Hawaiian art

Fictional characters:

- Madge, a long-running advertising character for Palmolive dishwashing detergent portrayed by Jan Miner
- Madge Allsop, long-suffering bridesmaid and longtime companion of Dame Edna Everage (played by actress Emily Perry)
- Madge Bishop, one of the matriarchs of the Australian soap opera Neighbours
- Madge Harvey, on the ITV programme Benidorm
- Madge, a character in the children's television show It's a Big Big World
- Madge Madsen, a character in the TV show The Office.
- Madge Owens, in the play Picnic and the 1955 film Picnic
- Madge Undersee, a character in the Hunger Games trilogy
- Madge Weinstein, fictional Internet personality, creation and alter ego of underground filmmaker Richard Bluestein
- Madge Wildfire, in Sir Walter Scott's novel The Heart of Midlothian
