= Peggy (given name) =

- Pronunciation: /ˈpɛɡi/
- Gender: Feminine
- Language: English

Origin
- Origin: nickname for Margaret
- Meaning: 'pearl'

Other names
- Related names: Margaret, Margarita

Peggy is a female first name (often curtailed to "Peg") derived from Meggy, a diminutive version of the name Margaret.

== People ==
=== Writers ===
- Peggy Adam, French comic book artist and illustrator
- Peggy Adler (born 1942), American writer
- Peggy Anderson (1938–2016), American author and journalist
- Peggy Carr, Vincentian poet
- Peggy Pond Church (1903–1986), American writer
- Peggy Dennis, American Russian journalist, author and Communist activist
- Peggy Dern, American novelist
- Peggy Dunstan (1920–2010), New Zealand poet and writer
- Peggy Fortnum (1919–2016), English illustrator
- Peggy Frew (born 1976), Australian author
- Peggy Goodin (1923–1983), American novelist
- Peggy Hull (1889–1967), American journalist
- Peggy Bennette Hume, British playwright and children's author
- Peggy Kornegger, American writer
- Peggy McIntosh (born 1934), American writer and activist
- Peggy Moreland, American novelist
- Peggy Noonan (born 1950), American author and commentator
- Peggy Orenstein (born 1961), American writer
- Peggy O'Shea (1922–2014), American screenwriter
- Peggy Parish (1927–1988), American author
- Peggy Parnass (1927–2025), German journalist, author and actress
- Peggy Payne, American writer
- Peggy Peterman (c. 1936–2004), American journalist
- Peggy Pettitt (born 1950), American dramatist
- Peggy Rathmann (born 1954), American writer
- Peggy Shaw (born 1944), American dramatist
- Peggy Sloane (1943–2009), American writer
- Peggy Fletcher Stack (born 1951), American journalist, editor and author
- Peggy Thompson, Canadian screenwriter, producer, playwright and professor
- Peggy Vining (1929–2017), American poet laureate
- Peggy Webb (writer) (born 1942), American novelist
- Peggy Webling (1871–1949), British playwright, novelist and poet
- Peggy Wehmeyer, American journalist

=== In entertainment ===
- Peggy Ahern (1917–2012), American child actress
- Peggy Allenby (1896–1966), American actress
- Peggy Ashcroft (1907–1991), English actress
- Peggy Bacon (radio producer) aka "Aunty Peggy" - BBC radio and television producer and radio presenter
- Peggy Baker (born 1952), Canadian dancer, choreographer and teacher
- Peggy Bernier (1907–2001), American comedian and actress
- Peggy Blow (born 1952), Latina German-American actress
- Peggy Carlisle, British actress
- Peggy Cartwright (1912–2001), Canadian silent film actress
- Peggy Cass (1924–1999), American actress
- Peggy Ann Clifford (1921–1986), English character actress
- Peggy Conklin, American film, television and theatre actress
- Peggy Converse, American actress
- Peggy Cummins (1925–2017), Irish actress
- Peggy Dolan, American actress
- Peggy Dow (born 1928), American actress
- Peggy Drake (1922–2014), American actress
- Peg Entwistle (1908–1932), English actress
- Peggy Evans (1921–2015), British actress
- Peggy Fears (1903–1994), American actress
- Peggy Feury (1924–1985), American actress
- Peggy Ann Garner (1932–1984), American child actress
- Peggy George (c. 1908–1978), American actress
- Peggy Hopkins Joyce (1893–1957), American actress, model and dancer
- Peggy Hyland (1884–1973), British actress
- Peggy Knudsen (1923–1980), American actress
- Peggy Lipton (1946–2019), American actress
- Peggy Lloyd (1913–2011), American actress
- Peggy Lu, American actress
- Peggy Maley (1923–2007), American actress
- Peggy McCay (1927–2018), American actress
- Peggy McIntaggart, Canadian model
- Peggy Miley (born 1941), American actress and writer
- Peggy Moffitt (1937–2024), American model and actress
- Peggy Mondo (1927–1991), American actress
- Peggy Montgomery (1904–1989), American actress
- Peggy Moran (1918–2002), American actress
- Peggy Mount (1915–2001), English actress
- Peggy Novak (1907–1969), British actress
- Peggy O'Dare (1898–1959), American actress
- Peggy O'Day (1900–1964), American actress
- Peggy O'Neal (born 1963), American voice actress
- Peggy O'Neil (1898–1960), Irish-American Vaudeville actress
- Peggy Ovire, Nigerian actress
- Peggy Pearce (1894–1975), American actress
- Peggy Phango (1928–1998), South African actress and singer
- Peggy Pope (1929–2020), American actress
- Peggy van Praagh (1910–1990), British ballerina
- Peggy Rajski, American filmmaker
- Peggy Ramsay (1908–1991), Australian-born British theatrical agent
- Peggy Rea (1921–2011), American actress
- Peggy Ryan (1924–2004), American dancer and actress
- Peggy Shannon (1907–1941), American actress
- Peggy Shanor (1895–1935), American actress in silent films
- Peggy Shaw (1905–1990), American silent film actress
- Peggy Siegal (born 1947), American entertainment publicist
- Peggy Simpson (1913–1994), British actress
- Peggy Sinclair, English actress
- Peggy Stewart (1923–2019), American actress
- Peggy Taylor (1927–2002), American actress
- Peggy Thorpe-Bates (1914–1989), British actress
- Peggy Vrijens (born 1976), Dutch actress
- Peggy Walton-Walker (born 1943), American film and television actress
- Peggy Webber (1925–2026), American actress
- Peggy Wood (1892–1978), American actress
- Peggy Ann Wood (1912–1998), British actress, director and theatre manager
- Diana Serra Cary, known as Baby Peggy (1918–2020), American child actress

=== In music ===
- JPEGMafia, sometimes referred to as Peggy (born 1989), American rapper, singer, and record producer
- Peggy Cochrane (1902–1988), English musician, singer and composer
- Peggy Connelly (1931–2007), American singer and actress
- Peggy Gilbert (1905–2007), American jazz musician and bandleader
- Peggy Glanville-Hicks (1912–1990), Australian composer and music critic
- Peggy Gou (born 1991), South Korean DJ and musician
- Peggy Hayama (1933–2017), Japanese singer
- Peggy Jones (1940–2015), American musician
- Peggy King (born 1930), American singer
- Peggy Lee (1920–2002), American jazz singer
- Peggy Lennon, American singer, one of the Lennon Sisters
- Peggy Little (born 1942), American singer-songwriter
- Peggy March (born 1948), American pop singer
- Peggy Mann (1919–c. 1988), American jazz musician
- Peggy O'Keefe (1928–2019), Australian-Scottish musical artist
- Peggy Pryde (1867–1943), British music hall performer
- Peggy Santiglia (born 1944), American pop singer
- Peggy Scott-Adams (1948–2023), American pop singer
- Peggy Seeger (born 1935), American folk singer
- Peggy Stern (born 1948), American jazz musician
- Peggy Stuart Coolidge (1913–1981), American classical composer
- Peggy Sue (born 1943), American country singer
- Peggy Zina (born 1975), Greek 'laika' singer

=== In sports ===
- Peggy Antonio (1917–2002), Australian cricketer
- Peggy Assinck (born 1983), Canadian ice sledge hockey player and neuroscientist
- Peggy Babin (born 1976), French athlete
- Peggy Beer (born 1969), German heptathlete
- Peggy Kirk Bell (1921–2016), American golfer and golf instructor
- Peggy Büchse (born 1972), German long-distance swimmer
- Peggy Butler (1897–1971), British fencer
- Peggy Clarke (1926–2018), British chess player
- Peggy Clasen (born 1969), American speed skater
- Peggy Conley, American professional golfer
- Peggy Cramer (1937–2016), American baseball player
- Peggy Crowe (1956–2012), American speed skater
- Peggy Dawson-Scott, British tennis player
- Peggy Dickens (born 1975), French slalom canoeist
- Peggy Fairweather, Jamaican cricketer
- Peggy Fenton (1927–2013), American baseball player
- Peggy Fleming (born 1948), American figure skater
- Peggy Flournoy (1904–1972), American football and baseball player and coach
- Peggy Frair (born 1950), American luger
- Peggy Griffin, Irish camogie player
- Peggy Hardwiger (born 1967), German sailor
- Peggy Ichkoff, American table tennis player
- Peggy Kaplan, American bridge player
- Peggy Sita Kihoue, Congolese long jumper
- Peggy Lee Leather (1959–2023), American wrestler
- Peggy Llewellyn (born 1972), American motorcycle racer
- Peggy Lokando (born 1989), English-born Congolese footballer
- Peggy McCarthy (rower) (born 1956), American rower
- Peggy McLean (1926–2013), American table tennis player
- Peggy Michel (born 1949), American tennis player
- Peggy Michell (1905–1941), British tennis player
- Peggy Morgan (born 1981), American mixed martial arts fighter
- Peggy Nietgen (born 1986), German footballer
- Peggy Parratt (1883–1959), American football player and coach
- Peggy Provost (born 1977), French footballer
- Peggy Regenwetter (born 1971), Luxembourgish table tennis player
- Peggy Schoolcraft (born 1960), American bodybuilder
- Peggy Schwarz (born 1971), German pair skater
- Peggy Solomon (1908–1995), American bridge player
- Peggy Sonntag (born 1999), German Paralympic swimmer
- Peggy Steedman, Scottish chess player
- Peggy Sutherlin, American bridge player
- Peggy de Villiers (born 1993), South African swimmer
- Peggy Waleska (born 1980), German rower
- Peggy Wilson (born 1934), American professional golfer

=== In politics ===
- Peggy Balboni, American politician
- Peggy Bennett (born 1958), American politician
- Peggy Blackford (1942–2024), American diplomat
- Peggy Blair, Canadian lawyer
- Peggy Butts, Canadian politician
- Peggy Cabral (born 1947), Dominican politician, diplomat and TV presenter
- Peggy Chew Howard (1760–1824), First Lady of Maryland
- Peggy R. Cook (1939–2011), American politician
- Peggy Davis-Mullen, American politician
- Peggy Duff (1910–1981), British political activist
- Peggy Farrell, (1920–2003), Irish businesswoman and Fianna Fáil politician
- Peggy Fenner (1922–2014), British politician
- Peggy Flanagan (born 1979), American politician
- Peggy Hessen Følsvik (born 1960), Norwegian trade unionist
- Peggy Gibson (born 1949), American politician
- Peggy Gilmour, American politician
- Peggy Gossett-Seidman, American politician and Florida State Legislative Representative
- Peggy Herbison (1907–1996), British politician
- Peggy Jay (1913–2008), English Labour politician
- Peggy Johnson, American businesswoman
- Peggy Judd (born 1962), American politician
- Peggy Kerns, Colorado politician
- Peggy Krusick (born 1956), American politician
- Peggy Lamm, American politician
- Peggy Lehner, American politician
- Peggy Leppik (born 1943), American politician
- Peggy Littleton, American politician
- Peggy Smith Martin (1931–2012), American politician
- Peggy Mast (born 1948), American politician
- Peggy Maxie (1936–2024), American politician
- Peggy Mayfield (born 1963), American politician
- Peggy McGaugh, American politician
- Peggy Middleton, British politician
- Peggy Nash (born 1951), Canadian politician
- Peggy Nkonyeni (born 1961), South African politician
- Peggy Palmer (born 1945), American politician
- Peggy Pendleton (born 1946), American politician
- Peggy Pierce (1954–2013), American politician
- Peggy Quince (born 1948), American judge
- Peggy Rosenzweig (born 1936), American politician
- Peggy Rosson (born 1935), Texas politician
- Peggy Rotundo (born 1949), American politician
- Peggy Sattler, Canadian politician
- Peggy Sayers (born 1941), American politician
- Peggy Schierenbeck, German politician
- Peggy Scott (born 1961), American politician
- Peggy Serame, Motswana politician
- Peggy Simone, American politician from Florida
- Peggy Stevenson (1924–2014), American politician
- Peggy Wallace (1947–2020), American politician
- Peggy Webb, American politician
- Peggy Wilson (born 1945), American politician
- Peggy Wright, Canadian politician from Alberta
- Peggy Yu (born 1965), Chinese businesswoman

=== Other professions ===
- Peggy Ahwesh (born 1954), American video artist
- Peggy Angus (1904–1993), British painter, designer and educator
- Peggy Antrobus, Grenadian activist, author and scholar
- Peggy Bacon (1895–1987), American artist
- Peggy Bauer (1932–2004), American wildlife photographer
- Margaret "Peggy" Bourke-White (1904–1971), American photographer
- Peggy Boyd (1905–1999), one of Scotland's first air ambulance nurses; served during World War II.
- Peggy Brock (1948–2023), Australian historian
- Peggy Brunache, Haitian American food historian and archaeologist
- Peggy Bulger, American folklorist
- Peggy Cebe, professor of physics
- Peggy Charren (1928–2015), American activist
- Peggy Cherng, American billionaire businesswoman
- Peggy Cooper Cafritz (1947–2018), American civil rights activist, educator, philanthropist and art collector
- Peggy Cowley (c. 1890–1970), American painter
- Peggy Crewe-Milnes, 20th-century English justice of the peace
- Peggy Cripps (1921–2006), English debutante and author
- Peggy Cyphers (born 1954), American painter
- Peggy Deamer (born 1950), American architect
- Peggy DesAutels (born 1955), American philosopher
- Peggy Detmers, American sculptor
- Peggy Dulany, American philanthropist
- Peggy Eaton (1799–1879), American, wife of John Henry Eaton and figure in the Petticoat affair
- Peggy Eisenhauer, American lighting designer
- Peggy Fairbairn-Dunlop, Samoan-New Zealand academic
- Peggy Farrell, (1932–2021), American costume designer
- Peggy Ferro (1949–1998), American activist
- Peggy Fogelman, American museum director
- Peggy Gale (born 1944), Canadian curator
- Peggy Giordano, American criminologist
- Peggy Guggenheim (1898–1979), American art collector and socialite
- Peggy Guido (1912–1994), English archaeologist
- Peggy Hamilton (c. 1894–1984), American fashion and costume designer
- Peggy Hård (1825–1894), Swedish clerk
- Peggy Hartanto (born 1988), Indonesian fashion designer
- Peggy Hay (1924–2016), New Zealand designer
- Peggy Hettrick (died 1987), American murder victim
- Peggy Hodges (1921–2008), British engineer
- Peggy Jackson, Welsh archdeacon
- Peggy Johnson (1976–1999), American murder victim
- Peggy Napangardi Jones (1951–2014), Australian artist
- Peggy Kelman (1909–1998), American aviation pioneer
- Peggy A. Kidwell, American historian of science
- Peggy J. Kleinplatz 21st century, Canadian clinical professor, psychologist and sexologist
- Peggy Koopman-Boyden (born 1943), New Zealand gerontologist
- Peggy Lemaux, American plant biologist
- Peggy Luhrs (1945–2022), American women's rights activist
- Peggy McIntosh (born 1934), American academic and anti-racism activist
- Peggy McKercher (born 1929), Canadian conservationist and academic
- Peggy McMath, American kidnapping victim
- Peggy McDowell Curlin (1940–2005), American women's health advocate
- Peggy Mulambya-Kabonde, Zambian feminist theologian
- Peggy Brewer Musgrave, economist
- Peggy Nadramia, American editor and administrator
- Peggy Rockman Napaljarri (born 1940), Australian artist
- Peggy Noland, American fashion designer
- Peggy Oki (born 1956), American skateboarder, surfer, artist and environmental activist
- Peggy Oti-Boateng, Ghanaian biochemist
- Peggy Papp, American family therapist
- Peggy Pascoe (1954–2010), American historian
- Peggy Phelan (born 1948), American feminist scholar
- Peggy Piesche, German literary and cultural scientist
- Peggy Robertson (1916–1998), English professional assistant and script supervisor for Albert Hitchcock
- Peggy Rae Sapienza (1944–2015), American science fiction convention organizer
- Peggy Sager (1924–2002), Australian dancer and educator
- Margarita "Peggy" Schuyler Van Rensselaer (1758–1801), sister in law of Alexander Hamilton
- Peggy Shepard, American local government and environmentalist
- Margaret "Peggy" Shippen (1760–1804), American Loyalist spy for the British and second wife of Benedict Arnold
- Peggy Speas, American linguist
- Peggy Spicer (1908–1984), New Zealand painter
- Peggy Sullivan (1929–2020), American librarian and educator
- Peggy Jo Tallas (1944–2005), American bank robber
- Peggy Weil, American artist working in digital media
- Peggy Welch (born 1955), American nurse and politician from Indiana
- Peggy Whitson (born 1960), American astronaut
- Peggy Willis-Aarnio (1948–2016), American choreographer, historian, author and teacher

== Animals ==
- Peggy, a dog actor

== Fictional characters ==
- Peggy Biggs, in the American TV series Mike & Molly
- Peggy Blackett, a character in Arthur Ransome's Swallows and Amazons books
- Peggy Blumquist, in the American TV series Fargo
- Peggy Bundy, in the American sitcom Married... with Children
- Peggy Carter, a Marvel Comics character
- Peg Gallagher, from the TV show Shameless
- Peggy Hill, in the American animated TV series King of the Hill
- Peggy Mitchell, in the British soap opera EastEnders
- Peggy Olson, in the American TV series Mad Men
