= Mairead =

Mairead, also spelt Maighread, is a feminine given name, the Scottish Gaelic equivalent of Margaret. The Irish form is spelt Mairéad, Máiréad, Maighréad, or Máighréad. Notable people with the name include:

- Mairead Buicke (born 1981), Irish operatic soprano also active in concert and recital work
- Mairéad Byrne (born 1957), Irish poet
- Mairéad Carlin (born 1988), Irish singer
- Mairead Curran (born 1968), Australian-born children's entertainer, actress and voiceover artist
- Mairéad Farrell (IRA activist) (1957–1988), Irish volunteer of the Provisional Irish Republican Army (IRA)
- Mairéad Farrell, Irish Sinn Féin politician
- Mairead inghean Eachainn, spouse of Alexander Stewart, 1st Earl of Buchan and mother of Alexander Stewart, Earl of Mar
- Mairead Maguire (born 1944), Irish peace activist, Nobel Peace Prize laureate
- Mairéad McAtamney (born 1944), retired Irish sportsperson
- Mairead McGuinness (born 1959), Irish EU Commissioner
- Mairead McKinley, award-winning Irish actress
- Mairead Nash of Queens of Noize, English indie/disco or Wonky pop DJ duo based in London
- Maighréad Ní Dhomhnaill (born 1955), Irish traditional singer from Kells, County Meath
- Máiréad Ní Ghráda (1896–1971), Irish poet, playwright, and broadcaster born in Kilmaley, County Clare
- Mairéad Ní Mhaonaigh (born 1962), Irish fiddler and the lead vocalist for the Irish traditional band Altan
- Máiréad Nesbitt (born 1979), classical and Celtic music performer, most notably as a violinist
- Mairead Ronan (nee Farrell), Irish radio presenter and television personality
- Máiréad Tyers (born 1998), Irish Actress

== See also ==
- List of Irish-language given names
- Máire, the Irish language form of Mary/Maria
- Mariota, Countess of Ross
