= Margaret (disambiguation) =

Margaret is an English feminine given name, originally derived from Greek, via Latin and French forms.

Margaret may also refer to:

== Arts, entertainment, and media ==
- Margaret (2011 film), an American drama film written and directed by Kenneth Lonergan
- Margaret (2009 film), a BBC television film about Margaret Thatcher
- Margaret (album), a concept album about American poet Margaret Rucker by Jason Webley
- Margaret (Little Britain), a character from the British television and radio sketch show Little Britain
- Margaret (magazine), a Japanese shōjo manga magazine published by Shueisha
- Margaret (The West Wing), a character from the political drama series The West Wing
- "Margaret" (song), a song by Lana Del Rey from the album Did You Know That There's a Tunnel Under Ocean Blvd
- "Margaret", a song from the album Whatevershebringswesing by Kevin Ayers
- Margaret, an 1845 novel by American author Sylvester Judd

== Inhabited places ==
- Margaret, Alabama, United States
- Margaret, North Carolina, United States
- Margaret, Manitoba, Canada

== Natural formations ==
- Margaret (moon), a moon of Uranus
- Margaret Creek, a stream and state waterway in Athens and Meigs counties of Ohio
- Margaret Island, Budapest, Hungary
- Margaret Island (Nunavut), Canada
- Margaret Lake (disambiguation)
- Margaret River (disambiguation)

== Ships ==
- Scottish warship Margaret, built in 1505
- CGS Margaret, the first vessel to be built specifically for the Canadian Customs Preventive Service, 1914
- Margaret (1791 ship), an American maritime fur trade ship
- Margaret (1799 brig), an English ship wrecked in 1803
- Margaret (1804 ship), launched at Calcutta and sailed to England for the British East India Company
- USS Margaret, the name of several U.S. Navy ships

== Other uses ==
- Margaret Bridge, Budapest, Hungary
- The Margaret, a historic apartment building in North Omaha, Nebraska, United States

== See also ==
- Lady Margaret (disambiguation)
- Małgorzata, a Polish given name equivalent to Margaret
- Margret (disambiguation)
- Margareta, a feminine given name
- Margarethe, a feminine given name
- Margarita (disambiguation)
- Margarite, a calcium rich member of the mica group of the phyllosilicates
- Margherita (disambiguation)
- Marguerite (disambiguation)
- Saint Margaret (disambiguation)
- Santa Margherita (disambiguation)
- Santa Margarita (disambiguation)
