= Margherita =

Margherita is an Italian feminine given name. It also is a surname. As a word, in Italian it means "daisy". The name is related to Margaret.

== Given name ==
As a name, it may refer to:

- Margherita da Trento (anglicized as Margaret of Trent) companion of Fra Dolcino of Novara, leader of the heretical New Apostles (c. 2nd half of 1200s-1307)
- Margherita Aldobrandini (1588–1646), Duchess consort of Parma
- Margherita de' Medici (1612–1679), Duchess of Parma and Piacenza
- Margherita Maria Farnese (1664–1718), Duchess of Modena and Reggio
- Princess Margherita of Bourbon-Parma (1847–1893)
- Margherita of Savoy (1851–1926), former Queen Consort of Italy and wife of Umberto I
- Margherita, Archduchess of Austria-Este (1930–2022)
- Margherita Bagni (1902–1960), Italian actress
- Margherita Piazzola Beloch (1879–1976), Italian mathematician
- Margherita Boniver (born 1938), Italian politician
- Margherita Buy (born 1962), Italian actress
- Margherita Caffi (1650–1710), Italian painter of still lifes
- Margherita Carosio (1908–2005), Italian operatic soprano
- Margherita Durastanti (fl. 1700–1734), Italian singer
- Margherita Galeotti (1867–after 1912), Italian pianist and composer
- Margherita Gargano (born 1952), Italian middle-distance runner
- Margherita Gonzaga (disambiguation)
- Margherita Granbassi (born 1979), Italian fencer
- Margherita Grandi (1894–1972), Australian-born Italian soprano born Margaret Gard
- Margherita Guidacci (1921–1992), Italian poet
- Margherita Hack (1922–2013), Italian astrophysicist and popular science writer
- Margherita Magnani (born 1987), Italian middle-distance runner
- Margherita Roberti, American operatic soprano whose career began in 1948 and ended in 1988
- Margherita Sarfatti (1880–1961), Italian journalist and mistress of Benito Mussolini
- Margherita Taylor (born 1972), English TV and radio presenter
- Margherita Zalaffi (born 1966), Italian fencer

== Surname ==
- Lesli Margherita, American actress
- Pabitra Margherita, Indian politician

== See also ==
- Regina Margherita (disambiguation)
- Santa Margherita (disambiguation)
- Pizza Margherita
- "Felicidad (Margherita)", a song
- Margaret (name)
- Margaret (disambiguation)
- Margarita (disambiguation)
