= Saint Margaret =

Saint Margaret, St. Margarets, or St. Margaret's may refer to:

== People ==
In chronological order:

- Saint Margaret the Virgin of Antioch (died 304)
- Saint Margaret of Scotland (c. 1045–1093)
- Saint Margaret of England (died 1192)
- Saint Margaret of Hungary (1242–1271)
- Saint Margaret of Cortona (1247–1297)
- Saint Margaret of Castello (1287–1320)
- Saint Margaret the Barefooted (1325–1395)
- Saint Rita of Cascia (1381–1457)
- Saint Margaret Clitherow (1556–1586)
- Saint Margaret Ward (died 1588)
- Saint Marguerite Marie Alacoque (1647–1690)
- Saint Teresa Margaret of the Sacred Heart (1747–1770)
- Saint Marguerite Bays (1815–1879)

== Places and buildings ==
=== United Kingdom ===
- Ilketshall St Margaret, Suffolk, England
- St Margaret South Elmham, Suffolk, England
- St Margarets, Herefordshire, a village and parish
- St Margarets, London, a suburb and neighbourhood
- St Margaret's at Cliffe, Kent
- St Margaret's Bus Station, Leicester, England
- St Margaret's Hope, Orkney Islands
- St Margaret's Ward, Ipswich, Suffolk
- Stanstead St Margarets, Hertfordshire

=== Other countries ===
- Church of St Margaret of Scotland (disambiguation), a list of churches around the world
- St. Margaret, Belize, a village in Cayo District, Belize
- Saint Margaret Island, Victoria, Australia
- St. Margarets, New Brunswick, Canada
- St. Margaret's, Dublin, a town in Fingal, Ireland
- St. Margaret's Bay (disambiguation)
- St Margaret's Church (disambiguation)
- St Margaret's School (disambiguation)

== Other uses ==
- Great Barr Hall, former home of the St Margaret's Mental Hospital, Walsall, England
- SS St Margaret, a number of ships with this name
- St Margaret's GAA, a Gaelic football club in County Dublin, Ireland
- Society of Saint Margaret, order of women in the Anglican Church

== See also ==
- Margaret (disambiguation)
- Sainte-Marguerite (disambiguation)
- Sankt Margarethen (disambiguation)
- Santa Margherita (disambiguation)
- Santa Margarita (disambiguation)
- Santa Margarida (disambiguation)
