= St. Margaret's Church =

St. Margaret's Church is often used to mean St Margaret's, Westminster, which forms part of the UNESCO World Heritage Site at Westminster, Greater London.

It may also refer to:

== Australia ==
- St Margaret's Church, Eltham, Melbourne, Victoria
- St. Margaret's Uniting Church, Hackett, Australian Capital Territory

== Barbados ==
- St. Margaret's Church, Barbados

== Hong Kong ==
- St. Margaret's Church, Hong Kong

== Italy ==
- Church of Saint Margaret, Brugherio

== Malta ==
- Church of St Margaret, Sannat
- St Margaret's Chapel, San Gwann

== Norway ==
- St. Margaret's Church, Oslo

== Romania ==
- St. Margaret's Church, Mediaș

== United Kingdom ==
=== England ===
- St Margaret's Church, Abbotsley, Cambridgeshire
- St Margaret's Church, Aspley, Nottingham
- St Margaret's Church, Barking, London Borough of Barking and Dagenham
- Church of St Margaret of Antioch, Blackfordby, Leicestershire
- St Margaret's Church, Bucknall, Lincolnshire
- St Margaret's Church, Burnham Norton, Norfolk
- St Margaret's Church, Burnage, Greater Manchester
- St Margaret's The Queen, Buxted, East Sussex
- Church of St Margaret of Antioch, Bygrave, Hertfordshire
- St Margaret's, Cley, Norfolk
- Church of St Margaret of Antioch, Darenth, Kent
- St Margaret of Antioch, Edgware, London Borough of Barnet
- St Margaret's Church, Finchley, London Borough of Barnet
- St Margaret's Church, Fletton, Peterborough
- St Margaret's Church, Great Barr, Walsall
- St Margaret's Church, Hales, Norfolk
- St Margaret's Church, Halliwell, Greater Manchester
- St Margaret's Church, Halstead, Kent
- St Margaret of Antioch Church, Headingley, West Yorkshire
- St Margaret's Church, High Bentham, North Yorkshire
- St Margaret's Church, Hopton, Norfolk
- St Margaret's Church, Hornby, Lancashire
- St Margaret's Church, Horsmonden, Kent
- St Margaret's Church, Ifield, West Sussex
- St. Margaret, Ilketshall, Suffolk
- King's Lynn Minster (St Margaret's Church), Norfolk
- St Margaret's, Lee, London Borough of Lewisham
- St Margaret's Church, Leicester
- St Margaret of Antioch Church, Leigh Delamere, Wiltshire
- Church of St Margaret of Antioch, Liverpool
- St Margaret and St James' Church, Long Marton, Cumbria
- St Margaret's Church, Lowestoft, Suffolk
- Church of St Margaret of Antioch, Northam, Devon
- St Margaret's Church, Oxford
- St Margaret's Church, Owthorpe, Nottinghamshire
- St Margaret's Church, Putney, London Borough of Wandsworth
- St Margaret's Church, Rochester, Kent
- St Margaret's Church, Rottingdean, East Sussex
- St Margaret Lothbury, City of London
- St Margaret Pattens, City of London
- Stanstead St Margarets, Hertfordshire
- Church of St Margaret, Streatley, Bedfordshire
- St Margaret's Church, West Hoathly, West Sussex
- St Margaret's, Westminster, London
- St Margaret's Church, Whaddon, Gloucestershire
- St Margaret's Church, Wolstanton, Staffordshire
- St Margaret's Church, Wrenbury, Cheshire

=== Scotland ===
- St Margaret of Scotland, Aberdeen
- St Margaret's Church, Aberlour, Moray

=== Wales ===
- St Margaret's Church, Roath, Cardiff
- Marble Church, Bodelwyddan, Denbighshire

== See also ==
- St Margaret Clitherow's Church
- St. Margaret’s Episcopal Church (disambiguation)
- Saint Margaret (disambiguation)
- St Margaret's School (disambiguation)
