= Clare Hollingworth =

English journalist and author (1911–2017)

Clare Hollingworth OBE
- Hollingworth in Saigon, 1968
- Born: 10 October 1911; Knighton, Leicester, England
- Died: 10 January 2017 (aged 105); Central, Hong Kong
- Resting place: St. Margaret of Antioch, Bygrave, Hertfordshire, England
- Occupation: Journalist
- Years active: 1939–1981
- Known for: Being the first journalist to report the outbreak of World War II
- Spouses: Vandeleur Robinson (m. 1936; div. 1951) Geoffrey Hoare (m. 1951; died 1965)

Clare Hollingworth OBE (10 October 1911 – 10 January 2017) was an English journalist and author. She was the first war correspondent to report the outbreak of World War II, described as "the scoop of the century". As a rookie reporter for The Daily Telegraph in 1939, while travelling from Poland to Germany, she spotted and reported German forces massed on the Polish border; The Daily Telegraph headline read: "1,000 tanks massed on Polish border"; three days later she was the first to report the German invasion of Poland.

Hollingworth was appointed OBE by Elizabeth II for "services to journalism" in 1982. She died on 10 January 2017 at the age of 105.

== Early life ==
Hollingworth was born in 1911 in Knighton, a southern suburb of Leicester, the daughter of Daisy and Albert Hollingworth. During World War I, her father took over the running of his father's footwear factory, and the family moved to a farm near Shepshed. She showed an early interest in becoming a writer, against opposition from her mother, and her interest in warfare was stimulated by visits to historical battlefield sites in Britain and France with her father. After leaving school, she attended a domestic science college in Leicester, which she did not enjoy.

== Pre-war ==
Hollingworth became engaged to the son of a local family known to her own, but instead of marriage, she went to work as secretary to the League of Nations Union (LNU) Worcestershire organiser. She then won a scholarship to the UCL School of Slavonic and East European Studies in London, and later, a place at Zagreb University to study Croatian.

Hollingworth started to write articles on a freelance basis for the New Statesman. In June 1939, she was selected to fight the parliamentary seat of Melton for the Labour Party in the general election that was due to take place by the end of 1940, but the outbreak of war led to the suspension of elections and, by the 1945 election, a different Labour candidate had been chosen.

Following the 1938 Munich Agreement, when the German speaking Sudetenland was incorporated into Germany, she went to Warsaw, working with Czech refugees. Between March and July 1939, she helped rescue thousands of people from Hitler's forces by arranging British visas. The experience also led to her being hired by Arthur Watson, the editor of The Daily Telegraph, in August 1939.

== World War II ==
Hollingworth had been working as a Telegraph journalist for less than a week when she was sent to Poland to report on worsening tensions in Europe. She persuaded the British Consul-General in Katowice, John Anthony Thwaites, to lend her his chauffeured car for a fact-finding mission into Germany. While driving along the German–Polish border on 28 August, Hollingworth observed a massive build-up of German troops, tanks and armoured cars facing Poland, after the camouflage screens concealing them were disturbed by wind. Her report was the main story on The Daily Telegraph's front page on the following day. Her report was headlined: "1,000 Tanks Massed on Polish Frontier; 10 Divisions Reported Ready For Swift Stroke; From Our Own Correspondent."

On 1 September, Hollingworth called the British Embassy in Warsaw to report the German invasion of Poland. To convince doubtful Embassy officials, she held a telephone out of the window of her room to capture the sounds of German forces. Hollingworth's eyewitness account was the first report the British Foreign Office received about the invasion of Poland.

She continued to report on the situation in Poland, and, in 1940, by then working for the Daily Express, went to Bucharest, where she reported on King Carol II's forced abdication and the ensuing unrest. Her telephoned reports ignored censorship rules and she is reported to have once avoided arrest by stripping naked. In 1941, she went to Egypt and subsequently reported from Turkey, Greece and Cairo. Her efforts were hampered, because women war correspondents did not receive formal accreditation. After General Bernard Montgomery took Tripoli in 1943, she was ordered to return to Cairo. Wishing to remain at the front lines, however, she went on to cover General Dwight D. Eisenhower's forces in Algiers, writing for the Chicago Daily News. She subsequently reported from Palestine, Iraq and Persia. During this time, she became the first person to interview the Shah of Iran.

== Later career ==
During the post-war decades, Hollingworth reported on conflicts in Palestine, Algeria, China, Aden and Vietnam. The BBC stated that, although she was not the earliest woman war correspondent, "her depth of technical, tactical and strategic insight set her apart." The New York Times described her as "the undisputed doyenne of war correspondents". She amassed considerable expertise in military technology and – after pilot training during the 1940s – was particularly knowledgeable about aircraft.

Immediately after the war, she began working for The Economist and The Observer. In 1946, she and her husband Geoffrey Hoare were at the scene of the King David Hotel bombing in Jerusalem, which killed 91 people. She later was said to have refused to shake the hand of the Irgun leader Menachem Begin, who many years later became the Prime Minister of Israel, because of his role in ordering the event. By 1950, she had moved from her base in Cairo to Paris, working for The Guardian. She started to visit Algeria and developed contacts with the Algerian National Liberation Front. She reported on the Algerian War in the early 1960s.

Early in 1963, still working for The Guardian, she was in Beirut and began to investigate Kim Philby, a correspondent for The Observer, discovering that he had departed for Odessa on a Soviet ship. The Guardian's editor, Alastair Hetherington, fearing legal action, held up the story of Philby's defection for three months, before publishing her detailed account on 27 April 1963. His defection was subsequently confirmed by the government. She was appointed The Guardian's defence correspondent in 1963, the first woman in the role.

In 1967, she left The Guardian and began contributing to The Daily Telegraph again. Her ambition to work in warzones rather than cover government foreign policy encouraged the move. She was sent to Vietnam in 1967 to cover the Vietnam War. She was one of the earliest commentators to predict that the war would end in stalemate and her reports were also distinguished by her attention to the opinions of Vietnamese civilians.

In 1973, she was sent to China and became The Daily Telegraph's China correspondent, the first since the formation of the People's Republic of China in 1949. She met Zhou Enlai and Mao Zedong's wife Jiang Qing. She was the last person to interview the Shah of Iran; the journalist John Simpson commented that "She was the only person he wanted to speak to". Hollingworth stayed in China for three years and moved to Hong Kong in the 1980s. In 1981, she retired and moved to British Hong Kong, also spending time in Britain, France and China. She observed the Tiananmen Square protests of 1989 from a hotel balcony.

== Personal life ==
Hollingworth was married twice; in 1936 she married Vandeleur Robinson, the League of Nations Union (LNU) regional organiser in south-east England but the marriage failed during the war. They divorced in 1951 and the same year she married Geoffrey Hoare, The Times' Middle East correspondent; Hoare died in 1965.

From 1981, Hollingworth lived in Hong Kong. She was a near-daily visitor to the Foreign Correspondents' Club, where she was an honorary goodwill ambassador. In 1990, she published her memoirs under the title Front Line. In 2006, Hollingworth sued her financial manager, fellow Correspondents' Club member Thomas Edward Juson (also known as Ted Thomas), for the removal of nearly $300,000 from her bank account. Juson defended his actions as investments but agreed to repay the money in 2007; by late 2016, however, he had not yet done so fully. Hollingworth's great-nephew Patrick Garrett published a biography of her in 2016, called Of Fortunes and War: Clare Hollingworth, First of the Female War Correspondents.

Hollingworth died at her home in Glenealy, Hong Kong on 10 January 2017, at the age of 105. In accordance with her wishes, her body was returned to England and buried in the churchyard of St Margaret of Antioch in Bygrave, Hertfordshire.

== Awards and honours ==
In 1962, Hollingworth won Woman Journalist of the Year for her reporting of the civil war in Algeria (Hannen Swaffer Awards, UK). She won the James Cameron Award for Journalism (1994). In 1999, she received a lifetime achievement award from the UK television programme What the Papers Say. In 1982, she was made an Officer of the Order of the British Empire for services to journalism. On 10 October 2017, Google showed a Doodle for Clare Hollingworth's 106th birthday.

== Charitable work ==
Hollingworth, while reporting from Poland at the outbreak of World War II in 1939, also performed charitable work, helping and working with Czechoslovak refugees in Poland as part of her work with the British Committee for Refugees from Czechoslovakia (BCRC). It is estimated she helped two- to three-thousand people escape from the Nazis' clutches, as the takeover frightened many to seek shelter.

== Bibliography ==
- The Three Weeks' War in Poland (1940), Duckworth ASIN B000XFSXEM
- There's a German Just Behind Me (1945), Right Book Club ASIN B0007J5R3Y
- The Arabs and the West (1952), Methuen ASIN B00692G566
- Mao and the Men Against Him (1984), Jonathan Cape ISBN 9780224017602
- Front Line (memoirs) (1990), Jonathan Cape ISBN 9780224028271
