= Margarita (disambiguation) =

A margarita is a cocktail.

Margarita or Margaritas may also refer to:

== Film and television ==
- Margarita (Philippine TV series), a 2007 Philippine drama
- Margarita (Indian TV series), a 1997 Indian romance
- Margarita (2024 TV series), a 2024 Argentine-Uruguayan series, spin-off of Floricienta
- Margarita (2012 film), a Canadian comedy–drama
- Margarita (2016 film), a Peruvian comedy
- "Margarita" (Soupy Norman), a 2007 television episode

== Life forms ==
- Margarita (gastropod), a sea snails genus
- Felis margarita, the Sand Cat
- Margarita (vegetable), a sweet potato cultivar

== People ==
- Margarita (cartoonist) (1921–1999), American creator of the Little Reggie comic strip
- Margarita (given name), including other people and fictional characters so named
- Margarita (Master and Margarita), a fictional witch created by Mikhail Bulgakov

== Places ==
=== Americas ===
- Margarita, Panama, a suburb of Colón
- Margarita, Bolívar, Colombia
- Margarita, Santa Fe, Argentina
- Isla Margarita, a Venezuelan island
  - Margarita Province, northern Venezuela

=== Europe ===
- Margarita, Piedmont, northwestern Italy
- Margarita, Álava, a hamlet in Spain's Basque Country

== Songs ==
- "Margarita" (Sleepy Brown song), 2006
- "Margarita" (Valery Leontiev song), first recorded by Sergey Minaev in 1986
- "Margarita" (Elodie song), 2019
- "Margarita", by Jack Ross, 1962
- "Margarita", by Pier Gonella from 667, 2023
- "Margarita", by Strayz, 2022
- "Margarita", by Traveling Wilburys from Traveling Wilburys Vol. 1, 1988
- "Margarita", by Wilkins, 1988

== Other uses ==
- Margaritas (restaurant), an American chain of Tex-Mex eateries
- 310 Margarita, a main-belt asteroid

== See also ==
- Las Margaritas (disambiguation)
- Margaret (disambiguation)
- Margaritaville (disambiguation)
- Margarito (disambiguation)
- Margherita (disambiguation)
- Marguerite (disambiguation)
- Santa Margarita (disambiguation)
- Infanta Margarita (disambiguation)
- Pizza Margherita, a pizza made with tomatoes, mozzarella, and basil
