= USS Hobson =

Gleaves-class destroyer

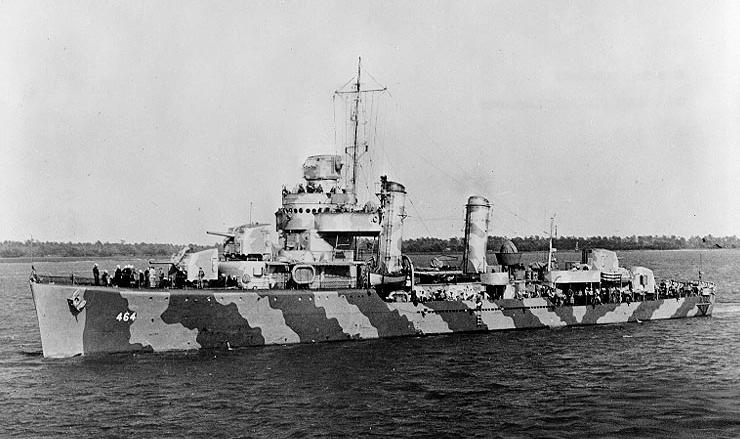
- USS Hobson off Charleston, South Carolina, 4 March 1942. She is painted in camouflage Measure 12 (Modified). This photograph has been censored to remove radar antennas atop her foremast and Mark 37 gun director.

History

United States
- Name: USS Hobson
- Namesake: Richmond P. Hobson
- Builder: Charleston Navy Yard
- Laid down: 14 November 1940
- Launched: 8 September 1941
- Commissioned: 22 January 1942
- Reclassified: 15 November 1944 as Destroyer Minesweeper (DMS-26)
- Fate: Sank in collision with USS Wasp in the North Atlantic 26 April 1952.

General characteristics
- Class & type: Gleaves-class destroyer
- Displacement: 1,630 tons
- Length: 348 ft 3 in (106.15 m)
- Beam: 36 ft 1 in (11.00 m)
- Draft: 11 ft 10 in (3.61 m)
- Propulsion: 50,000 shp (37 MW); 4 boilers; 2 propellers
- Speed: 37.4 knots (69 km/h)
- Range: 6,500 nmi (12,000 km; 7,500 mi) at 12 kn (22 km/h; 14 mph)
- Complement: 16 officers, 260 enlisted
- Armament: 5 × 5 in (127 mm) DP guns, 6 × 0.50 in (12.7 mm) guns, 6 × 20 mm AA guns, 10 × 21 in (533 mm) torpedo tubes, 2 × depth charge tracks

USS Hobson (DD-464/DMS-26), a Gleaves-class destroyer, was the only ship of the United States Navy to be named for Richmond Pearson Hobson, who was awarded the Medal of Honor for actions during the Spanish–American War. He would later in his career attain the rank of rear admiral and go on to serve as a congressman from the state of Alabama.

Hobson, constructed at a cost of $5 million, was launched at the Charleston Navy Yard on 8 September 1941; sponsored by Mrs. Grizelda Hobson, widow of Rear Admiral Hobson. As the new destroyer slid down the ways, she was cheered on by spectators and whistle blasts from other vessels on the Cooper River. Hobson was commissioned on 22 January 1942.

In 1952, Hobson collided with the aircraft carrier USS Wasp (CV-18) and sank with the loss of 176 crew. The ships had been undertaking amphibious exercises in the Atlantic, with Wasp practicing night flying, when Hobson attempted to turn in front of the carrier and collided with Wasp. Hobson was broken in two and quickly sank, causing the greatest loss of life on a US Navy ship since World War II.

== Service prior to D-day ==
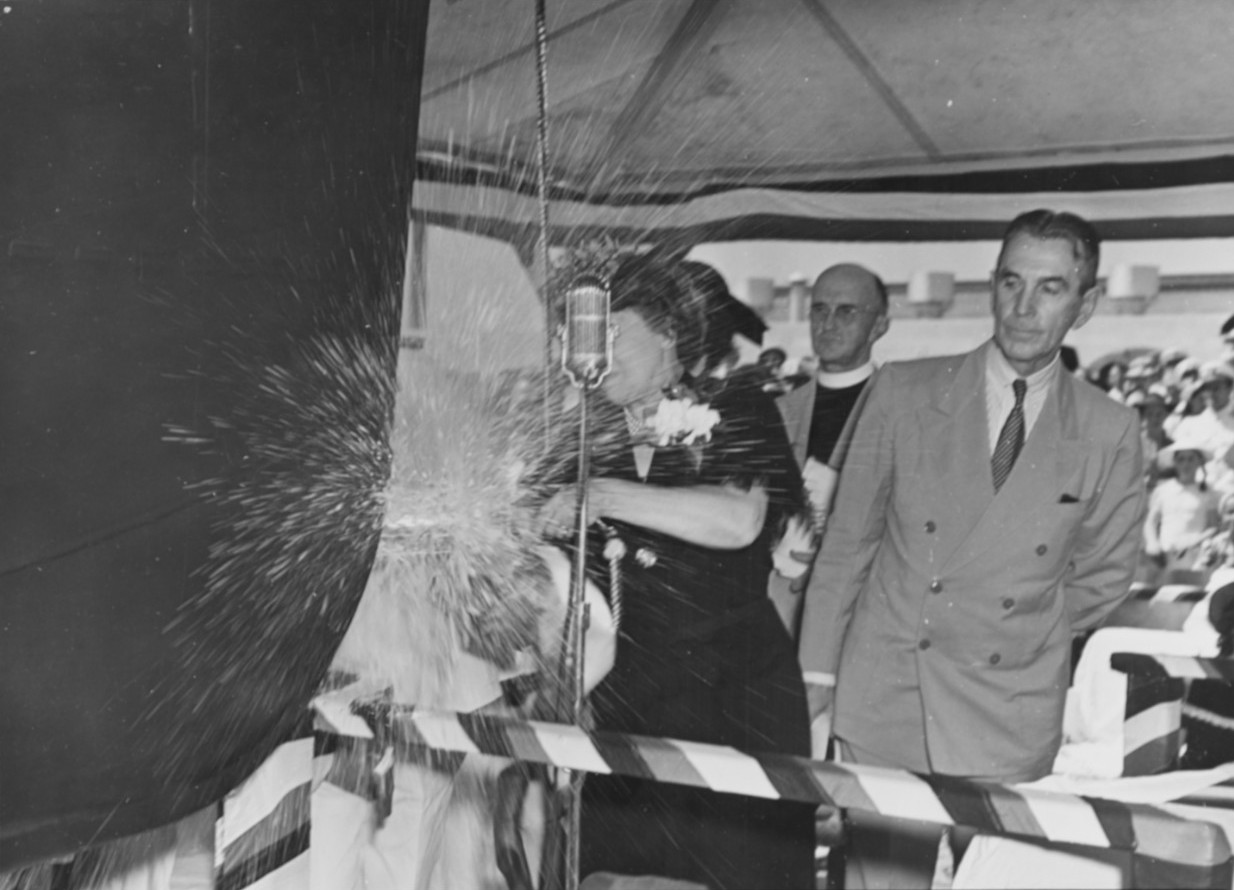
Mrs. Grizelda Houston Hull Hobson, widow of Rear Admiral Richmond P. Hobson, christens USS Hobson.

Hobson was pennant of Destroyer Division 20 (DesDiv 20), composed of USS Forrest (DD-461), USS Fitch (DD-462) and USS Corry (DD-463) that along with Destroyer Division 19 made up Destroyer Squadron 10 (DesRon 10), with its pennant on USS Ellyson (DD-454); Destroyer Flotilla Four, with its flag on USS Wainwright (DD-419); Destroyers, Atlantic Fleet. Following extensive shakedown and training operations in Casco Bay, Maine, the new destroyer under command of Lt. Cdr. Kenneth Loveland and her sister ships of Desdiv 20 joined veteran aircraft carrier USS Ranger (CV-4) at Norfolk, Virginia, and sailed on 1 July 1942 to escort her to Africa. Carrying a vital cargo of 72 P-40 aircraft, Ranger arrived safely via Trinidad, unloaded the planes and returned with Desdiv 20 on 5 August 1942. Hobson then conducted training exercises off Newport, Rhode Island, and Norfolk until 3 October 1942, when she departed Norfolk for Bermuda on escort duty.

=== Operation Torch, the Invasion of North Africa ===
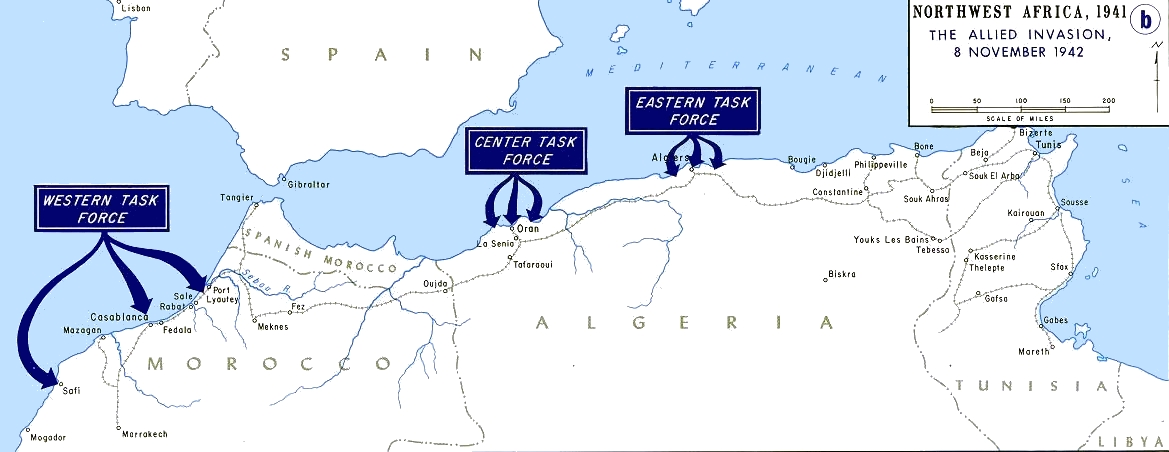
Map of Operation Torch.

As the Allies prepared to land in North Africa, Hobson, the three other destroyers of DesDiv 20 and Ellyson as destroyer flag under Capt. J.L. Holloway, joined Task Group 34.2 Airgroup under Rear Admiral Ernest D. McWhorter, composed of Ranger, Sangamon-class escort carrier USS Suwannee (CVE-27), light cruiser USS Cleveland (CL-55), two submarines and a fleet oiler. The group was part of Task Force 34, Western Naval Task Force- Morocco, under Rear Admiral Henry Kent Hewitt, flag on the cruiser USS Augusta (CA-31). The Allies organized three amphibious task forces to seize the key ports and airports of Vichy French-controlled Morocco and Algeria simultaneously, targeting Casablanca, Oran and Algiers. Successful completion of these operations was to be followed by an advance eastwards into Tunisia.

The Western Task Force (aimed at Casablanca) was composed of American army forces under the command of Major General George S. Patton and Rear Admiral Hewitt heading the naval operations. The army units consisted of the U.S. 2nd Armored Division and the U.S. 3rd and 9th Infantry Divisions—35,000 troops in a convoy of over 100 ships. They were transported directly from the United States in the first of a new series of UG convoys providing logistic support for the North African campaign. Hobson and the other four destroyers' main job was to screen and protect Ranger while the carrier's mobile air power supported the army's assault at Casablanca. Departing from Bermuda on 25 October 1942, Hobson's group arrived off Fedhala on 8 November 1942. As the Operation Torch landings proceeded, the air group provided indispensable air support, launching 496 combat sorties in the three-day operation. Ranger's planes hit shore batteries, the immobile Vichy French battleship Jean Bart, and later helped turn back the attack by French ships on the transport area in the Naval Battle of Casablanca. As Ranger's planes were attacking Jean Bart on D-Day Plus 2 (10 November), the French submarine Le Tonnant fired four torpedoes at the carrier which passed harmlessly astern. At 1010, Ellyson spotted a periscope and dropped a full barrage of depth charges on sight at shallow setting. As Ranger turned to port, Hobson dropped another full pattern at deep setting. Capt. Holloway later wrote, "I am convinced that this fortunate sight contact by Ellyson saved Ranger from torpedo attack at closer range." Casablanca capitulated to the American forces on 11 November 1942 and Ranger departed the Moroccan coast 12 November, returning to Norfolk on the 23d. Hobson screened Ranger until she sailed for Norfolk, leaving the Allies fully in command of the assault area.

=== Atlantic Convoy Duty ===
Upon her return to Norfolk on 27 November 1942, the destroyer took part in exercises in Casco Bay, later steaming with a convoy to the Panama Canal Zone in December. Hobson and DesDiv 20 again joined Ranger in early 1943 and the anti-submarine group sailed on 8 January 1943 to patrol the western Atlantic. Groups such as Ranger's did much to protect Allied shipping in the Atlantic from U-boats, and contributed to the eventual victory in Europe. Typical of Hobson's versatile performance was her rescue off Bermuda of 45 survivors from the British merchantman SS St Margaret on 2 March 1943. The freighter had been torpedoed and sunk four days earlier by the German submarine U-66 and the no. 3 lifeboat with 35 crew and passengers, under a red sail and towing a liferaft holding 10 more crewmen, had sailed 93 nautical miles southwest of the sinking, when it was spotted by Ranger's aircraft at 0745 hours. Hobson thereafter broke from the destroyer screen to investigate. The destroyer picked up the survivors at 1003 and the lifeboat and raft were sunk by gunfire from the ship. The St Margaret survivors were landed at Bermuda on Friday 5 March, where the crew were put on board an HM ship on 15 March and were landed at Portsmouth, England, seven days later.

In April 1943, Hobson and Ranger arrived at Naval Station Argentia, Newfoundland, and began operations out of that base. The ships provided air cover for convoys and anti-submarine patrol, and in July 1943 had the honor of convoying RMS Queen Mary, carrying Prime Minister Winston Churchill to the Quebec Conference. The veteran destroyer arrived in Boston 27 July 1943 to prepare for new duties.

=== Operation Leader, Bodø, Norway ===
Hobson sailed with Ranger and other ships 5 August 1943 to join the British Home Fleet at Scapa Flow. Arriving 19 August, she operated under Royal Navy orders in northern waters, helping to provide cover for vital supply convoys to Russia. While at Scapa Flow, she was inspected by US Secretary of the Navy Frank Knox and Admiral Harold Rainsford Stark on 21 September. Hobson and DesDiv 20 along with Ranger and the heavy cruisers USS Augusta and USS Tuscaloosa (CA-37) formed a task force under the command of Rear Admiral Olaf M. Hustvedt that executed Operation Leader, a daring raid of combined British and American naval forces on 2–4 October 1943, when Ranger's air wing of dive bombers, torpedo bombers and fighters staged a devastating attack on German shipping at Bodø, Norway. Following this operation, the destroyer continued to operate with Home Fleet. She screened the aircraft carrier HMS Formidable during flight operations in November and after two convoy voyages to Iceland, Hobson and Desdiv 20 returned to Boston and U.S. operational control 3 December 1943.

=== Hunter-killer anti-submarine duty ===
During the first two months of 1944, Hobson trained in Chesapeake Bay and operated with carriers between the East Coast and Bermuda. She joined escort carrier USS Bogue (CVE-9), flagship of Anti-Submarine Task Group 21.11, and the group's four other destroyers or destroyer escorts at Norfolk for temporary duty, departing 26 February 1944. These Hunter-killer Groups (HUK's) played a major part in driving German U-boats from the sea lanes, and this cruise was no exception. After patrolling for over two weeks, the destroyers spotted an oil slick, made sonar contact, and commenced depth charge attacks on the afternoon of 13 March 1944. The German submarine U-575 was severely damaged and was forced to surface, after which gunfire from Hobson, USS Haverfield (DE-393), a torpedo bomber from Composite Squadron Ninety-Five (VC 95) based on Bogue, the Canadian frigate HMCS Prince Rupert and an RAF Flying Fortress (No. 220 Squadron) sank her. After further anti-submarine sweeps as far east as the Azores, Hobson detached from the HUK on 25 March 1944, and returned to Boston 2 April 1944.

== D-Day, Utah Beach ==
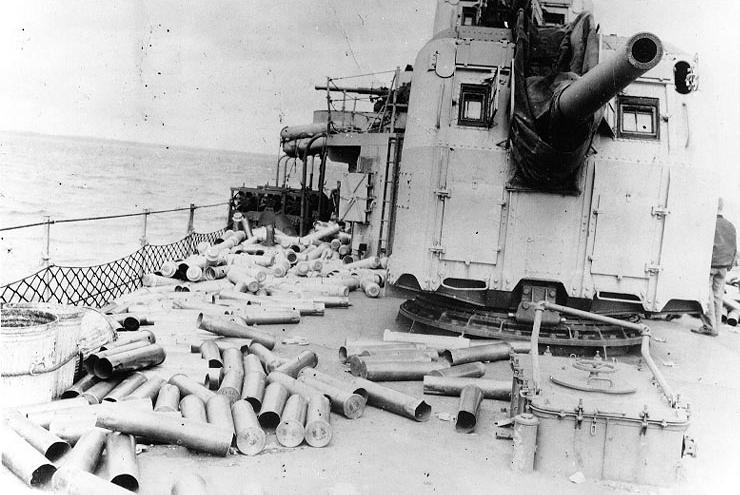
Expended cartridge cases and powder tanks from the ship's 5-inch/38 caliber guns litter the deck, after firing in support of the Normandy invasion off Utah Beach, 6 June 1944. This view was taken on the ship's afterdeck, with mount 54 at right.

For some time the Allies had been building up tremendous strength in England for the eventual invasion of France. Hobson and the other three destroyers of DesDiv 20, Corry, Forrest and Fitch, sailed from Norfolk on 21 April 1944 to join the vast armada of Operation Neptune that would transport and protect the soldiers and their mechanized equipment during Operation Overlord. Hobson spent a month on patrol off Northern Ireland, arriving at Plymouth on 21 May for final invasion preparations. Assigned to Rear Admiral Don P. Moon's Utah Beach Assault Group "U", flag on the USS Bayfield (APA-33), Hobson and her three sister-ships of DesDiv 20 were elements of Bombardment Group 125.8 that comprised the battleship USS Nevada (BB-36), the heavy cruisers Tuscaloosa, USS Quincy (CA-71), British cruiser HMS Black Prince (81), monitor HMS Erebus (I02), ten American destroyers, four British destroyers and a Dutch gunboat.

The destroyers arrived off "Point Mike", the outermost area of Utah with the other ships of the bombardment group at 0140 on 6 June. All vessels entering into Utah had to remain in their assigned asymmetrical and exact mine-swept channels that had been drawn up and cleared to provide the maximum safety from the mine peril and to permit access to all the carefully designated positions of the bombardment ships. Minesweepers cleared the area where transport craft would assemble and discharge; and provided adequate channels for all the amphibious boats between "Transport Area" and the landing beaches. The order of ships was the British destroyers HMS Enterprise (D52), HMS Hawkins (D86), and the Dutch gunboat HNLMS Soemba. The American destroyers USS Jeffers (DD-621), USS Glennon (DD-620), " Hobson and Forrest followed as screen for Bayfield and three other Allied transports carrying General Raymond O. Barton's 4th Infantry Division troops as far as the transport area. The destroyers then closed in on their action stations. Fire Support Unit 3, Hobson, Corry and Fitch, led the first waves of landing boats down the boat lane, breaking off in time to be in their stations at 0540.

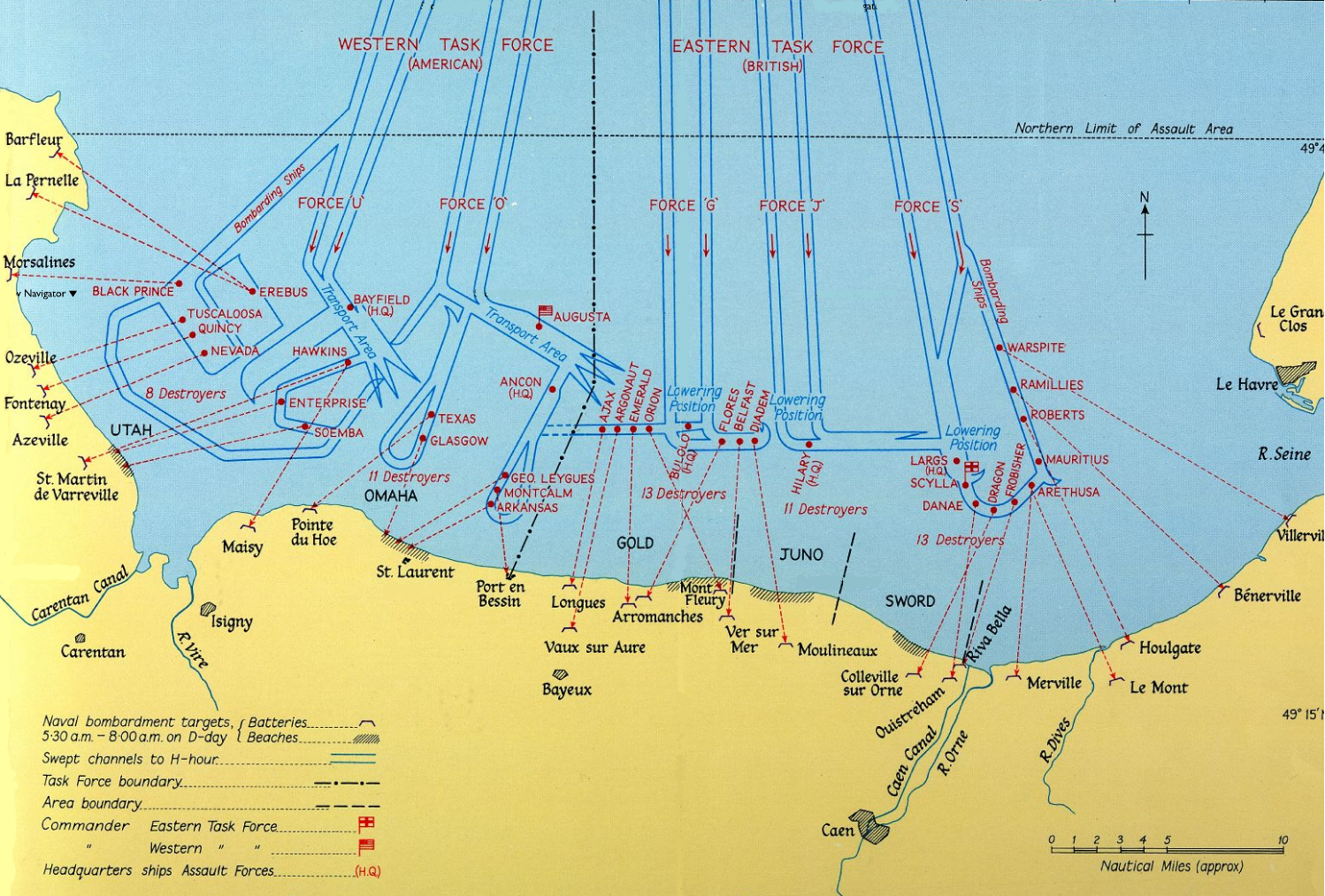
Map of the Normandy invasion area showing channels cleared of mines, location of vessels engaged in bombardment, and targets on shore.

The German shore batteries, having discovered the Allied invaders, began firing on the armada at 0530. At 0536, the group commander made the signal "Commence counter battery bombardment.", 14 minutes ahead of schedule. Hobson and the other ships began counter-firing as spent 5" and 8" shell casings littered their decks. Only the heavy ships had planes to spot for them. The destroyers were close enough to see their targets which consisted mostly of "strong points" just back of the beaches. Hobson, at station 1, was assigned firing on targets 70 and 72. At 0629, Hobson observed shell splashes near Corry and at 0633, Corry appeared to be hit amidships. As smoke from the intense shore firing drifted offshore and temporarily concealed Corry, Hobson shifted her fire at 0638 to target 86 which appeared to have been firing on Corry. This battery temporarily ceased firing as soon as taken under fire by Hobson. At 0644, the destroyer shifted her fire back to targets 70 and 72 since the leading boat wave was close to shore and neutralization of German firing from those areas was vital. At 0656, the smoke was extremely heavy on the beach, making it difficult to see the targets, and Hobson, per her prior firing orders, estimated that the first troops were going ashore and shifted fire to target 74, which was in an excellent position to deliver deadly enfilade and strafing fire on the Allied landing troops. At 0700, the smoke cover was clearing from Corry and the men on Hobson could see she was "in definite trouble with her back broken between the stacks" as targets 13A and 86 fired on the stricken destroyer. Corry, the worst naval loss of the D-Day landings, was hit by the Crisbecq Battery, whose three 210-millimeter (8.25-inch) guns had a range of 17–21 mi (27–34 km).

Since target 74 was then inactive, Hobson began alternately taking targets 13A and 86 under fire while keeping watch on target 74. At 0721, it was clear that Corry was sinking and Hobson began to close range on her while continuing her firing on the two targets. At that time, the group commander ordered Fitch to stand by the Corry since Hobson's mission of covering the landing beach flank was vital. By then the German shore batteries at 13A and 86 had ceased firing, and Hobson lowered her two boats to assist Fitch in picking up the Corry's survivors. Hobson then resumed her station and continued firing on target 74 and a nearby roadblock and strong point. At 0854, according to schedule, USS Butler (DD-636) relieved Hobson at her station, and Hobson was ordered to assume Corry's fire support mission at station 3. Hobson continued firing on German shore positions while simultaneously rescuing survivors from the water until returning to Plymouth, England, later that afternoon. The destroyer was not long out of the fray, however, returning on 8 June 1944 to screen the assault area. She also jammed glider bomb radio frequencies on 9–11 June and provided channel convoy protection.

=== Bombardment of Cherbourg ===
After the Allies' successful establishment of a bridgehead at Normandy, the German strategy was to bottle them up there, deny the Allies access to the nearest major port at Cherbourg and break their supply line. By mid-June U.S. infantry had sealed off the Cotentin Peninsula, but their advance had stalled and the Germans began to demolish the port's facilities. With the Allies sorely in need of Cherbourg to continue advancing through France, they renewed their efforts to capture the city, and by 20 June three infantry divisions under General "Lightning Joe" Collins had advanced within a mile of German lines defending Cherbourg. Two days later, the general assault began and on 25 June, a large naval task force began a concentrated bombardment of the town to help neutralize the threat of German coastal artillery and to provide support to the assaulting infantry.

Task Force 129 was divided into two divisions. Battle Group 1 under Admiral Morton Deyo's command, was assigned to bombard Cherbourg, the inner harbor forts, and the area west towards the Atlantic. Group 1 consisted of Tuscaloosa, Quincy, Nevada, HMS Glasgow (C21) and five destroyers: Ellyson (flag), USS Hambleton (DD-455), USS Rodman (DD-456), USS Emmons (DD-457), USS Murphy (DD-603), and USS Gherardi (DD-637).

Rear Admiral Carleton F. Bryant's smaller Battle Group 2 was assigned "Target 2", the Battery Hamburg, which was located near Fermanville, inland from Cape Levi, 6 miles (9.7 km) east of Cherbourg. Nevada in Group 1 was to use its main battery to silence what was described as "the most powerful German strongpoint on the Cotentin Peninsula". (Note: The German Battery Hamburg, located six miles inland, had four eleven-inch guns, well separated, protected by steel shields similar to naval gun turrets, and reinforced concrete casemates. It was manned by naval gunners. Supporting them nearby were six 88-mm, six heavy and six light antiaircraft guns. The battery was distinguished by long range, 40,000 yards (36,576 m), and the arc of train. The guns were sited to cover the westerly sea approaches to Cherbourg. They had an easterly limit of fire.(Morison, p.206)) Battle Group 2 would then complete the destruction, and pass westward to join Deyo's group. Bryant's Group 2 consisted of USS Texas (BB-35), USS Arkansas (BB-33), and five destroyers. These were USS Barton (DD-722) (flag), USS O'Brien (DD-725), USS Laffey (DD-724), Hobson (pennant), and USS Plunkett (DD-431). During the bombardment. Group 2 was in place by 0950 and Hobson and the other destroyers fired at the large batteries, screened the battleships Texas and Arkansas; and when the battleships were dangerously straddled, Hobson and Plunkett made covering smoke which allowed all to retire. At 1500, Deyo ordered cease fire and began withdrawing from the bombardment area. Group 2 headed back to Portsmouth, England at 1501.

After the action, Allied reports agreed that the most effective aspect of the bombardment was the fire that was provided by the small ships. Under the direction of army spotters, these ships were able to engage point targets up to 2,000 yards (1,800 m) inland, which proved invaluable in providing close support to the assaulting Allied infantry. In contrast, while the force's heavy guns disabled 22 of 24 assigned navy targets, they were unable to destroy any of them and, consequently, infantry assaults were required to ensure that the guns could not be reactivated. By 29 June, Allied troops occupied Cherbourg and its crucial port. Collins wrote to Deyo, stating that during the "naval bombardment of the coastal batteries and the covering strong points around Cherbourg ... results were excellent, and did much to engage the enemy's fire while our troops stormed into Cherbourg from the rear." After an inspection of the port defenses, an army liaison officer reported that the guns that had been targeted could not be reactivated, and those that could have been turned landward were still pointed out to sea when the city had fallen.

=== Invasion of Southern France and Mediterranean Convoy Duty ===
Following the surrender of Cherbourg, Hobson and most of Task Force 129 that had not sustained battle damage, were ordered to Belfast, Northern Ireland to join the attack transports that had assembled there following service in the Normandy Invasion and to await the move to the Mediterranean. Hobson and the other ships arrived at Belfast on 30 June and there, Task Group 120.6 under Admiral Deyo on Tuscaloosa was formed consisting of the transports and most of Task Force 129. They sailed on 4 July and arrived at Mers-el-Kébir, Algeria, 11 July 1944, and for a month after, performed convoy duties to and from Taranto, Italy.

The landing areas for Operation Dragoon the invasion of Southern France and the last major amphibious operation of the European theater, were designated "Alpha", "Delta" and "Camel" from west to east, covering three sets of beaches along the Provence Coast between Hyeres and Cannes. The Western Naval Task Force was formed under the command of Vice Admiral Hewitt to carry the U.S. 6th Army Group, also known as the Southern Group or Dragoon Force onto the shore. Joining Rear Admiral Bertram J. Rodgers' Delta Assault Force, Task Group 85.12 was the gunfire support group for the central invasion force under Rear Admiral Bryant on Texas. It consisted of the American battleships Texas and Nevada; light cruiser USS Philadelphia (CL-41) and French light cruisers Georges Leygues, and Montcalm; the surviving eight destroyers of DesRon 10 (Destroyer Unit 85.12.4), Ellyson, Rodman, Emmons, Forrest, Fitch, Hambleton, Macomb, and Hobson; French destroyers La Fantasque, Le Terrible, Le Malin, and four gun support craft, which sailed from Taranto at 1400 on 11 August 1944. "H-hour" was set for 0800 on 15 August. Early on 15 August 1944, Hobson acted as spotter for Nevada and her preliminary bombardment from the Baie de Bougnon. As troops stormed ashore at Delta Beach (Le Muy, Saint-Tropez), Hobson provided direct fire support with her own batteries. By 0815, the bombardment had destroyed enemy defenses and Major General William W. Eagles' famed "Thunderbirds" of the 45th Infantry Division landed without opposition. Hobson remained in the assault area until the next evening, arriving at Palermo on 17 August 1944 to take up Mediterranean convoy duty.

As the Allied offensive in Europe gained momentum, Hobson steamed as a convoy escort between Algeria, Italy, and France protecting vital supplies and troops. In the early morning darkness of 2 October 1944, Hobson was standing out from Marseille, France, during a violent gale, when her spotters observed distress calls from well inside an unswept area of the German- mined harbor. It was soon established that a liberty ship, the S.S. Johns Hopkins, moving to an anchorage after returning from Oran, Algeria, with 600 troops embarked, had struck a mine while navigating in the gale. Ordered to assist the stricken Hopkins, Hobson skillfully and carefully navigated through the perilous, mined area in gale-force wind and sea, and made repeated attempts to land alongside the liberty ship to offload her troops, although each time Hobson was forced to back off as the ships pounded heavily in the extreme weather. Through Lt. Cdr. Loveland's skillful ship-handling and that of his deck crew, the damage to Hobson was superficial. Hobson remained close aboard the stricken cargo ship until daylight when safe water was finally reached, the ships having crossed thirteen and one-half miles of unswept water. Hobson remained on scene over the next twenty-four hours, and until S.S. Johns Hopkins was successfully returned to port by a Navy fleet tugboat with no loss of life or injury to her personnel or troops.

== Service as a destroyer- minesweeper ==
In October 1944, with the Atlantic and Mediterranean theaters secured, all eight surviving destroyers of DesRon 10 returned to various east coast navy yards where over a period of approximately six weeks, they had their No. 4 5-inch guns replaced with gear for sweeping acoustic mines. On 15 November they were reclassified as destroyer-minesweepers (DMS 19–26). Hobson sailed for the United States on 25 October and arrived at Charleston via Bermuda on 10 November 1944. There she entered the Naval Shipyard and was converted to destroyer-minesweeper and commissioned DMS-26 on 15 November 1944, Lt. Cmdr. Joseph I. Manning, commanding. Throughout the month of December, she underwent trials and shakedown training off Charleston and Norfolk. In January 1945, the eight newly converted destroyer-minesweepers made their way from their conversion shipyards to the Pacific as the core of the 12-ship Mine Squadron (MinRon) 20, with flag on the Ellyson.

Hobson and several others in the squadron sailed on 4 January 1945 via the Panama Canal, with stops at San Diego for training and inspection, and then stood out from San Francisco for Hawaii, arriving at Pearl Harbor on 11 February 1945. Hobson was part of Mine Division (MinDiv) 58, along with Forrest (pennant), Fitch and Macomb. At Hawaii, she underwent further mine warfare training before sailing on 24 February 1945 with eight of the twelve ships of MinRon 20 as Task Unit 18.2.3 for Ulithi via Eniwetok and a role in the history of the last and greatest of the Pacific amphibious operations, Operation Iceberg, the assault on Okinawa.

== Okinawa, Kamikaze attacks ==
On 9 March 1945, Hobson arrived at Ulithi, the main staging area for the Okinawa Invasion 1,180 mi. away from the objective, where she and eight other members of her squadron engaged in exercises and calibration of their sweeping equipment until the remaining three sweepers arrived on the 12th. On the last day at sea Fitch wrecked her propeller on a reef and had to return to Pearl Harbor. The aircraft carriers departed for Okinawa on 14 March, and the eleven remaining sweeps of MinRon 20 left on the 19th. Given the nature of their task, the minesweepers had to be the first surface vessels at the target area and unlike the carriers, they headed directly to Okinawa, making the voyage in four days. While the four-day journey was uneventful, the two threats the minesweepers faced were Japanese air attacks and the deteriorating weather. Hobson arrived at Okinawa well in advance of the assault troops to sweep the offshore areas, where she was often attacked by Japanese planes. In the early hours of L-Day, she and Emmons were on radar picket duty with Hobson as fire support ship. As the amphibious assault began on 1 April 1945, Hobson also took up patrol duties and provided night illumination during the first critical days of the campaign. As desperate enemy suicide attacks were repulsed with heavy losses, Hobson was called upon on 13 April 1945 to take up a radar picket station where USS Mannert L. Abele (DD-733) had been sunk in a heavy kamikaze attack the previous night.

Hobson's executive officer, Lt. Robert M. Vogel gave this account: On 16 April 1945 at 0500 and 75 miles northwest of Okinawa, fifteen enemy planes spotted Hobson, USS Pringle (DD-477) and two accompanying gunboats and made passes at the ships; however, the attackers were driven off by anti-aircraft fire. At 0853, one of the planes made a suicide run on Pringle but was shot down by gunners on both Hobson and Pringle. Another dived on Pringle at 0920, slamming into the destroyer's bridge, and plowing through the superstructure deck, abaft the base of number one stack. A single 1,000-pound bomb, or two 500-pounders, penetrated the main and superstructure decks and exploded with a violent eruption, buckling the keel and splitting the vessel in two at the forward fire room. Pringle sank in six minutes.

Two minutes later, a single-engine aircraft began a suicide run on Hobson from the starboard side. Five-inch shells from the destroyer disintegrated the plane just short of the ship, but its 250-pound bomb penetrated the deck house. The explosion of the delayed action bomb started fires in the gunnery workshop, machine shop and electrical shop and blasted a hole in the deck over the forward engine room, wrecking steam and power lines. Four of her crew were killed and six wounded.

Two more suicide planes attacked Hobson but her gunners shot them into the sea. The two gunboats shot down another. The remaining Japanese planes continued to make passes for an hour before they withdrew. Meanwhile, the Hobson's crew extinguished the fires in fifteen minutes, rigged emergency power lines in four minutes and the ship continued to maneuver. Thirty-five minutes after the attack ended, Hobson had picked up 136 of the Pringle's 258 survivors, clinging to rafts and wreckage. The two gunboats rescued the others. During the attack, Hobson's gunners shot down four Japanese suicide planes in 67 minutes. That same morning, about 40 minutes before Pringle was sunk, the destroyer USS Laffey (DD-724) and several other ships on radar picket duty, had also been hit by kamikazes about fifty miles away.

After the attack, Hobson anchored at Kerama Retto, returning to Ulithi on 29 April 1945 and Pearl Harbor on 16 May 1945. Hobson then sailed via San Diego and the Panama Canal Zone to Norfolk Naval Shipyard, where she arrived on 15 June 1945 for repairs.

== Post war and sinking ==
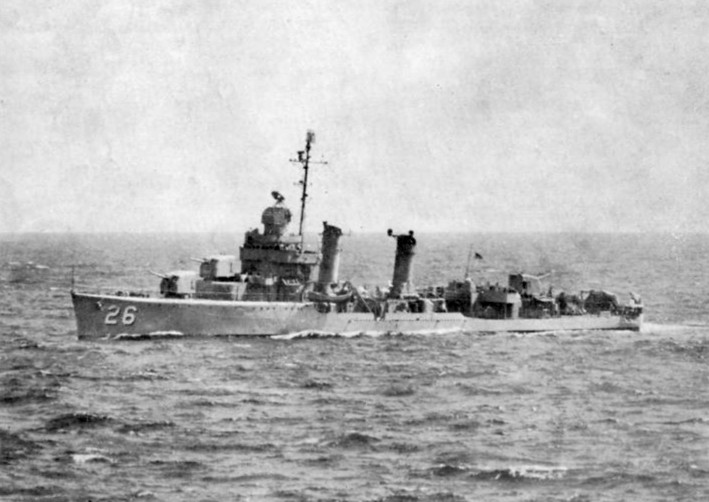
USS Hobson, in 1948.

The unconditional surrender of Imperial Japan came with Hobson still undergoing repairs. With repairs completed and after shakedown training, she spent February 1946 on mine-sweeping operations out of Yorktown, Virginia. The remainder of the year was spent in training and readiness exercises in the Caribbean and off Norfolk. Until 1950, the ship continued to operate off the East Coast and in Caribbean waters on amphibious and mine warfare operations. In late 1948, she visited Argentia and Halifax, Nova Scotia on mine-sweeping exercises with Canadian ships. With the outbreak of the Korean War in June 1950, Hobson's schedule of training intensified. She took part in amphibious exercises off North Carolina and Puerto Rico during 1950–51, and participated in carrier operations as a plane guard and screening ship.

During one such operation on the night of 26 April 1952 at 2220, Hobson was steaming in formation with the aircraft carrier USS Wasp (CV-18) and destroyers USS Rodman (DD-456) and USS Ross (DD-563) about 900 kilometres (490 nmi) southeast of St. John's, Newfoundland at 42°21′N 44°15′W during night flight operations en route to Gibraltar. Hobson was moving at 24 knots and following the carrier 3,000 yards off her starboard quarter with Rodman following Wasp off her port quarter. Hobson's commanding officer, Lt. Comdr. William J. Tierney, had been in command of the ship for 5 weeks. He anticipated that Wasp, preparing to recover her aircraft at 2300, would change course to 250–260 degrees to bring the carrier into the wind, necessary for the aircraft landings. The destroyer's executive officer, Lt. William A. Hoefer, was on the bridge with the conn and control of the ship when Tierney outlined a course to maneuver Hobson ahead of Wasp and then come up on the massive carrier's port quarter as the destroyer's new station. Rodman would move to the starboard quarter as her new station. Hoefer, who had been on Hobson for 16 months, was immediately concerned when he saw Tierney's plan and turned the conn over to Lt. Donald Cummings, so that he could voice his opposition and belief that Tierney's maneuver would put the two ships on a collision course. Since Wasp had to turn to starboard to recover aircraft, the trailing destroyer had two options, slow down and let Wasp turn, the conventional method, or cross in front of the carrier. A heated argument ensued that Hoefer lost and he strode off the bridge to the outside wing to cool off.

Meanwhile, Wasp's commanding officer, Capt. Burnham C. McCaffree, was on his bridge, where Lt. Robert Herbst had the conn and ordered right standard rudder and flank speed to bring the carrier into the wind. McCaffree observed the red aircraft warning lights of the two destroyers and believed that they were also beginning the evolution. Tierney, now in control of Hobson, ordered right standard rudder and a course of 130 degrees. The wind shifted and McCaffree ordered a necessary course change from 260 to 250 degrees to head into the wind. At that time Wasp's surface radar failed, while on Hobson, the port pelorus was fogged, thus preventing an accurate bearing on Wasp. McCaffree notified the destroyers of his course change, but it is unclear whether anyone on Hobson's bridge heard the communication. Tierney, without disclosing his intention, was going to put the Hobson into a Williamson turn that would bring the ship back to the point she had been. Tierney suddenly ordered full left rudder and within 30 seconds ordered full right rudder. Hoefer rushed back onto Hobson's bridge when he realized what Tierney was doing and yelled "Prepare for collision!, Prepare for collision!" At that moment, Tierney ordered left full rudder, intending to race ahead of Wasp which was bearing down on the destroyer. Aboard Wasp, Lt. Herbst told Capt. McCaffree, "We're in trouble" as McCaffree ordered "all back emergency."

At first it looked as though Hobson might escape the massive carrier as her bow and number-one stack moved past the carrier's course, but then there was a crash as Wasp struck Hobson amidships. The force of the collision rolled the destroyer-minesweeper over onto her port side, breaking her in two. The aft section of Hobson trailed alongside of the carrier while the forward half was temporarily lodged in the Wasp's bow. The aft part of the ship sank first but 40 of the survivors came from that section as men were shot out of a scuttle hatch they had managed to open, propelled by the force of water and expelling air. Aboard the carrier, life rafts were being dropped over and lines lowered. One set of double rafts fell on top of a cluster of five men who did not survive. One man, a chief petty officer in the bow, managed to grab a pipe protruding from Wasp just as Hobson's bow began sinking and leaped onto Wasp without getting wet. Rodman and Wasp pulled aboard 61 oil-coated survivors, but the destroyer and 176 of her crew including Tierney, who dove from the bridge into the sea moments before the carrier plowed into Hobson, were lost in less than five minutes. Most of the deceased crew were recovered by Ross and placed on the main deck. The sinking of Hobson was the worst non-combat accident for the U.S. Navy since the disappearance of the collier USS Cyclops (AC-4) with 306 crew and passengers en route from Barbados to Baltimore, Maryland, in March 1918, during World War I.

=== Aftermath and findings ===
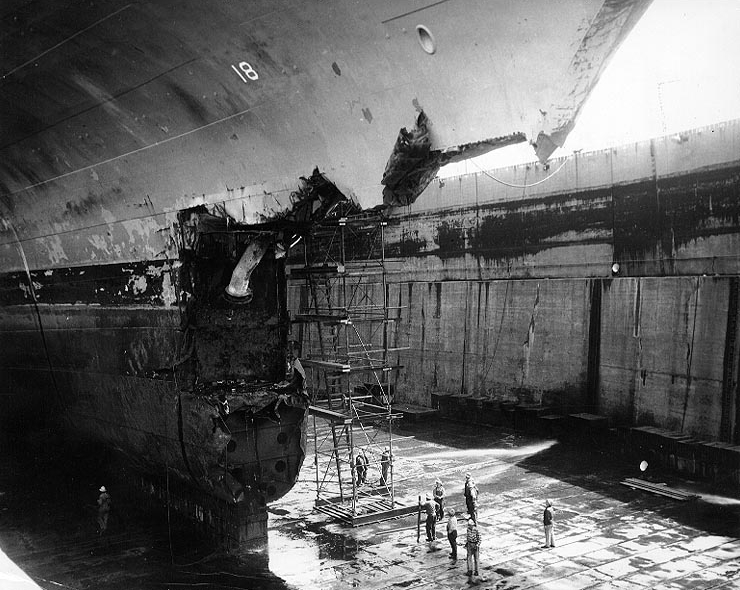
Damage sustained by Wasp during the collision

A court of inquiry performed an investigation into the sinking of Hobson in an effort to determine the cause of the tragedy. The opinion of the court of inquiry was "that the sole cause of the collision was the unexplained left turn made by the Hobson about 2224. In making this left turn the Commanding Officer committed a grave error in judgement." Since the commanding officer did not survive the collision, the reason for this error could not be determined. No one else was considered to be at fault and the crew of Wasp was absolved of any responsibility for the collision. The commanding officer of Hobson had six months of prior command experience on a High-speed transport (APD), but had been in command of Hobson for only five weeks. Seven days of that were underway and only 3 1/2 days were with the task group. The cost of repairs to Wasp was said to be $1 million ($12.1 million today).

As a direct result of the sinking of Hobson, upon recommendation of the court of inquiry, the Allied Navy Signal Book was changed. A special signal was to be put into use for carriers during aircraft operations. The court of inquiry also stated in its findings that, in the future, proposed schedules for aircraft launching and recovery should be provided to the vessels performing plane guard duties.

The court of inquiry also noted that Wasp, Rodman, and Hobson were all running without normal marine navigation lights, just red aircraft warning lights on top of their masts.

=== USS Hobson Memorial, Charleston, SC ===
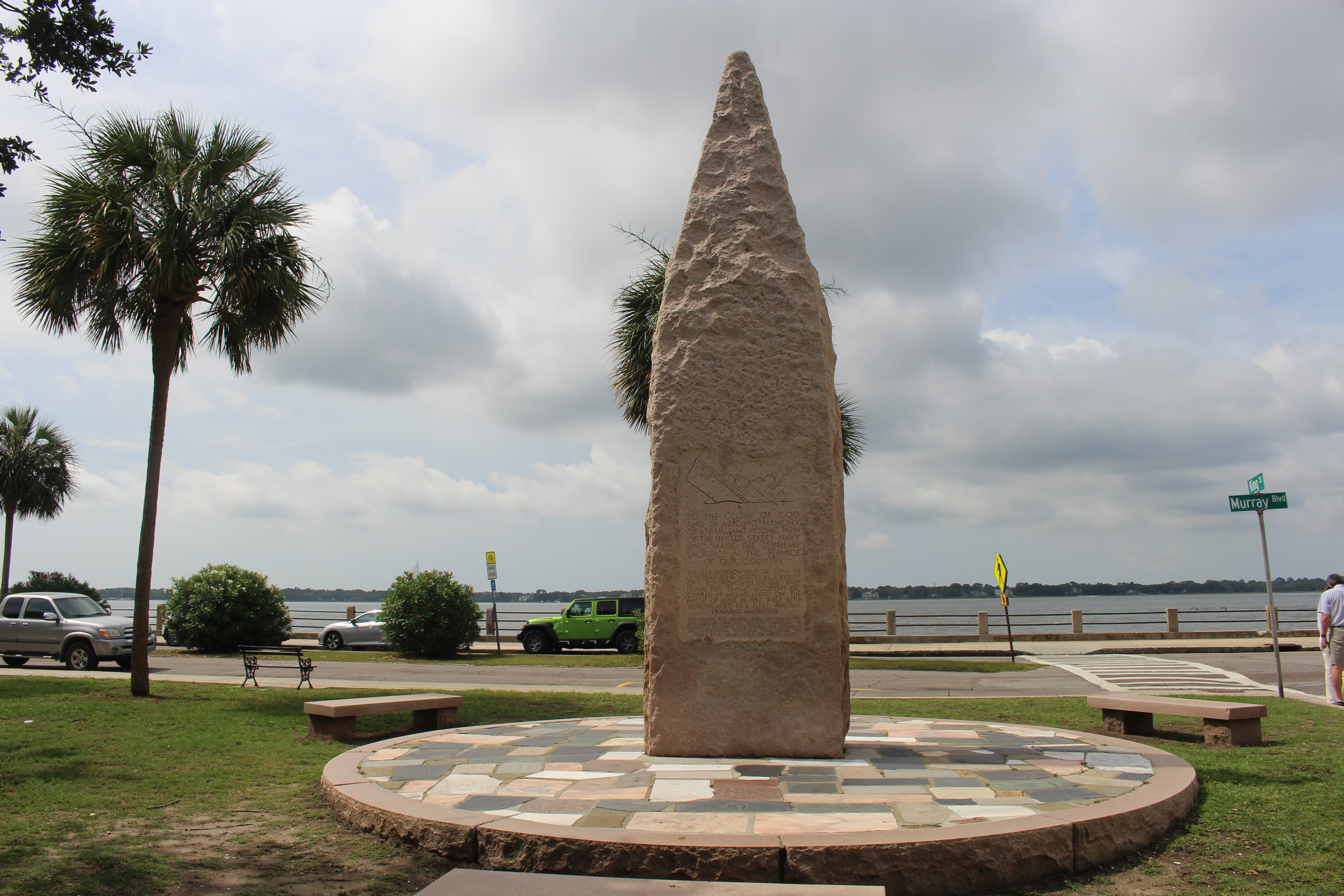
Memorial in Charleston, South Carolina

In 1954, the USS Hobson Memorial Society erected an obelisk memorial of Salisbury Pink granite, quarried from Salisbury, North Carolina, at the city where Hobson had been built 14 years earlier, Charleston, South Carolina. The memorial is dedicated to the 176 men of the Hobson who perished in the collision with Wasp. Surrounding the obelisk are stones from each of the 38 states where the men came from. Their names are inscribed and can also be seen in the 1954 dedication program for the memorial.

== Honors and awards ==
- Presidential Unit Citation
- American Campaign Medal
- European-African-Middle Eastern Campaign Medal with five battle stars
- Asiatic-Pacific Campaign Medal with one battle star
- World War II Victory Medal
- National Defense Service Medal

Hobson received six battle stars for World War II service, five in the European theater and one in the Asiatic Pacific theater, and shared in the Presidential Unit Citation awarded to the ships in the Bogue antisubmarine task group in the Atlantic, for the period 26 February to 25 March 1944.

Hobson's engagements were:

- Allied landing at Casablance, French Morocco – 8 Nov. 1942;
- Carrier strike at Bodo, Norway – Oct. 1943;
- Sank German submarine U-575 – 13 March 1944;
- Allied Landing at Normandy, France – 6 June 1944;
- Allied Landing- Southern France – 15 August 1944; and
- American Landing at Okinawa, Japan – April 1945.

Hobson's captain, Lt. Cdr. Loveland, was awarded the Legion of Merit with Combat "V" for his exceptionally meritorious conduct for depth-charging and subsequently sinking the U-575 on 13 March 1944 after it surfaced. For his gallantry in action at the Normandy D-Day amphibious assault on Utah Beach and later at the bombardment of German defenses at Cherbourg, Loveland was awarded the Silver Star. He was awarded the Navy and Marine Corps Medal for heroism and meritorious performance of duty in the face of great danger during the Hobson's attempted rescue and successful towing operation of the mined SS Johns Hopkins off Marseille, France, on 2 October 1944. For his extraordinary heroism during the attack at Okinawa, Hobson's commanding officer, Lt. Cdr. Manning, was awarded the Navy Cross. Also for the Okinawa action, Hobson's executive officer, Lt. Vogel, was awarded the Bronze Star and her engineer officer, Lt. (j.g.) Martin J. Cavanaugh Jr., and Chief Machinist's Mate, Howard B. Farris, were awarded the Silver Star.

== See also ==
- USS Frank E. Evans, sunk in a collision with HMAS Melbourne in 1969.
