= Margaret River =

Margaret River may refer to:

== Places ==
=== Western Australia ===
- Margaret River, Western Australia, town
- Margaret River (wine region), wine region
- Margaret River (South West, Western Australia), river
- Margaret River (Kimberley, Western Australia), river

=== Northern Territory ===
- Margaret River, Northern Territory, a locality

== Events ==
- Margaret River Pro, a surfing competition held in Western Australia

== See also ==
- Margaret (disambiguation)
- Margaret Creek, a stream and state waterway in Athens and Meigs Counties, Ohio
- Shire of Augusta Margaret River
