= Santa Margarida =

Santa Margarida may refer to:

== Places ==
=== Brazil ===
- Santa Margarida, Minas Gerais, a municipality
- Santa Margarida do Sul, a municipality in state of Rio Grande do Sul

=== Portugal ===
- Aldeia de Santa Margarida, in the municipality of Idanha-a-Nova
- Santa Margarida da Coutada, in the municipality of Constância
- Santa Margarida da Serra, in the municipality of Grândola
- Santa Margarida de Lousada, in the municipality of Lousada

=== Spain ===
- Santa Margarida (volcano), in Garrotxa, Catalonia
- Santa Margarida de Montbui, a municipality in Anoia, Catalonia
- Santa Margarida i els Monjos, a municipality in Alt Penedès, Catalonia

== See also ==
- Margarida
- Santa Margarita (disambiguation)
- Saint Margaret (disambiguation)
