= Margarito =

Margarito may refer to:

- Margaritus of Brindisi (c. 1149 – 1197), Grand Admiral) of the Kingdom of Sicily
- Antonio Margarito (born 1978), Mexican-American boxer
- Margarito d'Arezzo (fl. c. 1250–1290), Italian painter
- Margarito Bautista (1878–1961), Mexican evangelist for the Church of Jesus Christ of Latter-day Saints
- Margarito Fierros (born 1967), Mexican politician
- Margarito Flores García (1899–1927), Mexican Catholic priest, martyr and saint
- Margarito C. Garza (1931–1995), American judge and comic book enthusiast
- Margarito González (born 1979), Mexican football defender
- Margarito Pomposo (1910–2007), Mexican long-distance runner
- Margarito Teves (born 1943), Filipino politician

== See also ==
- Margarita (disambiguation)
