= Sankt Margarethen =

Sankt Margarethen or St. Margarethen may refer to the following places:

- Sankt Margarethen, Germany, a municipality in Schleswig-Holstein
- in Austria:
  - Sankt Margarethen an der Raab, in Styria
  - Sankt Margarethen an der Sierning, in Lower Austria
  - Sankt Margarethen bei Knittelfeld, in Styria
  - Sankt Margarethen im Burgenland
  - Sankt Margarethen im Lungau, in Salzburg
- St. Margarethen, a settlement in the municipality of Münchwilen, Thurgau, Switzerland

== See also ==
- Saint Margaret
- Sankt Margareten im Rosental, a town in Carinthia, Austria
- St. Margrethen, a municipality in the canton of St. Gallen, Switzerland
  - St. Margrethen railway station
  - St. Margrethen–Lauterach line
