= Santa Margherita =

Santa Margherita may refer to:

== Places in Italy ==
- Santa Margherita d'Adige, comune in the province of Padova
- Santa Margherita de' Cerchi
- Santa Margherita di Atri, frazione of the comune of Atri, province of Teramo
- Santa Margherita di Belice, comune in the province of Agrigento
- Santa Margherita di Pula, a frazione of Pula, Sardinia
- Santa Margherita di Staffora, comune in the province of Pavia
- Santa Margherita Ligure, comune in the province of Genova

== Churches ==
- The Cathedral of Santa Margherita or Cattedrale di Santa Margherita, see Montefiascone Cathedral
- The Church of Saint Margaret or Chiesa di Santa Margherita in Brugherio, Italy, see Saint Margaret, Brugherio

== See also ==
- Margherita (disambiguation)
- Santa Margarita (disambiguation)
- Saint Margaret (disambiguation)
- Sainte-Marguerite (disambiguation)
- Society of Saint Margaret, order of women in the Anglican Church
- St Margarets (disambiguation)
- Margaret (disambiguation)
