= Le Lesme =

- Commune
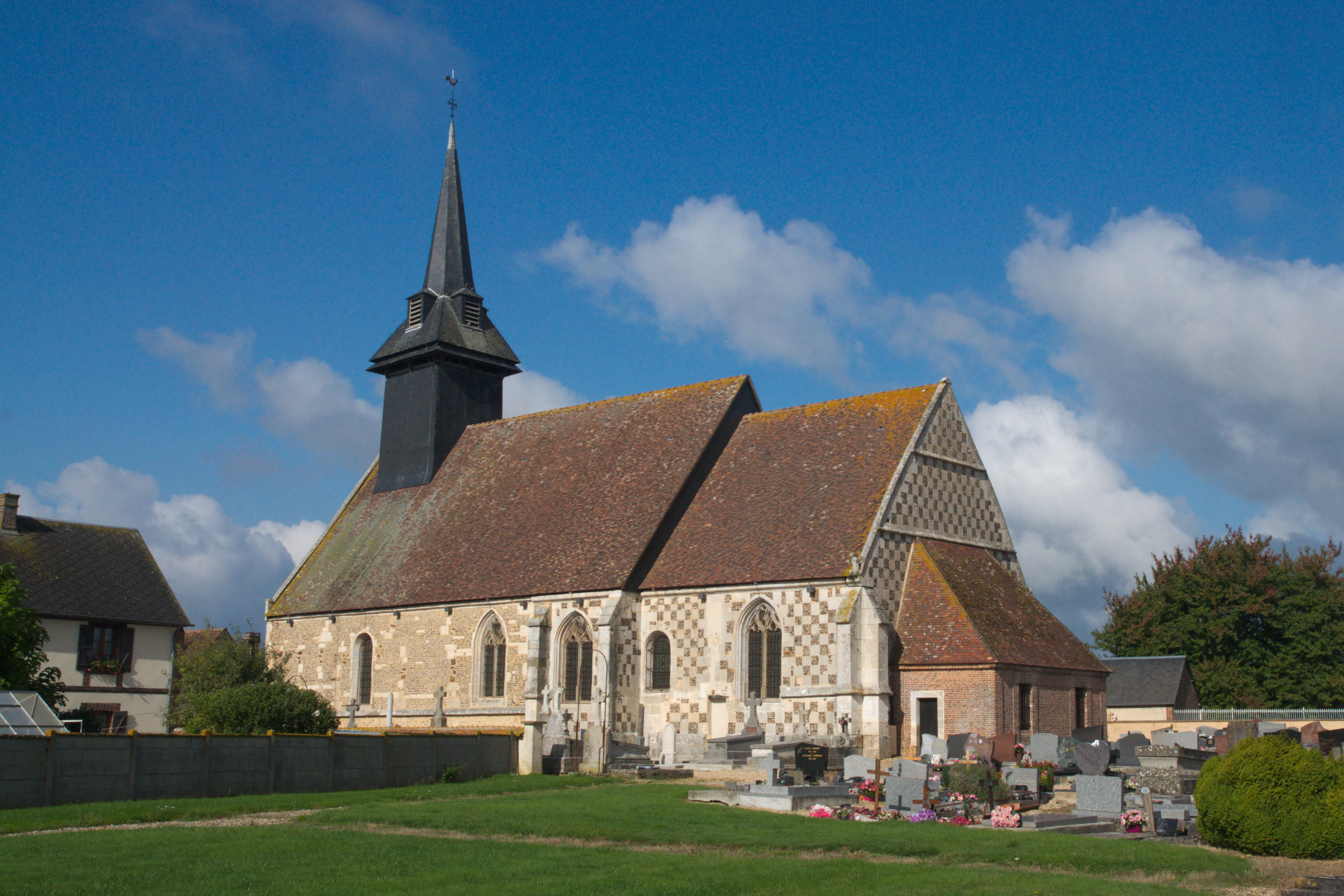
- The church of Sainte-Marguerite in Sainte-Marguerite-de-l'Autel
- Location of Le Lesme
- Location within France Location within Normandy
- Coordinates: 48°53′56″N 0°51′18″E
- Country: France
- Region: Normandy
- Department: Eure
- Arrondissement: Bernay
- Canton: Breteuil

Government
  - Mayor (2020–2026): Jean-Claude Surmulet
- Area^{1}: 26.50 km^{2} (10.23 sq mi)
- Population (2023): 682
  - Density: 25.7/km^{2} (66.7/sq mi)
- Time zone: UTC+01:00 (CET)
  - Summer (DST): UTC+02:00 (CEST)
- INSEE/Postal code: 27565 /27160
- ^{1} French Land Register data, which excludes lakes, ponds, glaciers > 1 km^{2} (0.386 sq mi or 247 acres) and river estuaries.

Le Lesme (French pronunciation: [lə lɛm]) is a commune in the department of Eure, northern France. The municipality was established on 1 January 2016 by merger of the former communes of Sainte-Marguerite-de-l'Autel and Guernanville.

== See also ==
- Communes of the Eure department
