= St Margaret's College =

St Margaret's College may refer to:

- St Margaret's College, Christchurch, girls' secondary school, New Zealand
- St Margaret's College, Otago, hall of residence of the University of Otago, New Zealand
- St. Margaret's Junior College, Tokyo, Japan

== See also ==
- St Margaret's School (disambiguation)
