= Guernanville =

- Part of Le Lesme
- Location of Guernanville
- Location within France Location within Normandy
- Coordinates: 48°53′23″N 0°50′36″E
- Country: France
- Region: Normandy
- Department: Eure
- Arrondissement: Évreux
- Canton: Breteuil
- Commune: Le Lesme
- Area^{1}: 3.23 km^{2} (1.25 sq mi)
- Elevation: 180 m (590 ft)
- Highest elevation: 191 m (627 ft)
- Lowest elevation: 153 m (502 ft)
- Population (2019): 104
  - Density: 32.2/km^{2} (83.4/sq mi)
- Time zone: UTC+01:00 (CET)
  - Summer (DST): UTC+02:00 (CEST)
- Postal code: 27160
- ^{1} French Land Register data, which excludes lakes, ponds, glaciers > 1 km^{2} (0.386 sq mi or 247 acres) and river estuaries.

Guernanville (French pronunciation: [ɡɛʁnɑ̃vil]) is a former commune in the Eure department in northern France. On 1 January 2016, it was merged into the new commune of Le Lesme.

== See also ==
- Communes of the Eure department
