= Regina Margherita =

Regina Margherita ("Queen Margherita") may refer to:

- Margherita of Savoy (1851–1926)
- Regina Margherita-class battleship
  - Italian battleship Regina Margherita (1901)
- Regina Margherita (Naples Metro), a metro station under construction

== See also ==
- Ponte Regina Margherita
- Margherita (disambiguation)
