= St. Margaret's Episcopal Church =

St. Margaret's Episcopal Church may refer to:

- St. Margaret's Episcopal Church (Annapolis, Maryland)
- St. Margaret's Episcopal Church and Cemetery, Hibernia, Florida
- St. Margaret's Episcopal Church (Palm Desert, California)
- St. Margaret's Episcopal Church (Woodbridge, Virginia)
- St. Margaret of Antioch Episcopal Church (Staatsburg, New York)

== See also ==
- St. Margaret's Church (disambiguation)
