= Sainte-Marguerite =

Sainte-Marguerite is French for Saint Margaret and may refer to the following places:

== Belgium ==
- Sint-Margriete, a section of Sint-Laureins in East Flanders province

== Canada ==
- Sainte-Marguerite, Chaudière-Appalaches, Quebec, northeast of Montreal
- Sainte-Marguerite-du-Lac-Masson, Quebec, northwest of Montreal, an early alpine skiing destination
- Sainte-Marguerite-Marie, Bas-Saint-Laurent region, Quebec
- Zec de la Rivière-Sainte-Marguerite, "controlled harvesting zone", in Quebec

== France ==
- Île Sainte-Marguerite, the largest of the Lérins Islands, off the coast of France, in Cannes
- Sainte-Marguerite de Pornichet, a seaside resort, in the Loire-Atlantique département, in France

Communes in France:

- Sainte-Marguerite, Haute-Loire, in the Haute-Loire département
- Sainte-Marguerite, Vosges, in the Vosges département

It is part of the name of several other French communes:

- Sainte-Marguerite-de-Carrouges, in the Orne département
- Sainte-Marguerite-de-l'Autel, in the Eure département
- Sainte Marguerite d'Elle, in the Calvados département
- Sainte Marguerite des Loges, in the Calvados département
- Sainte Marguerite de Viette, in the Calvados département
- Sainte-Marguerite-en-Ouche, in the Eure département
- Sainte-Marguerite-Lafigère, in the Ardèche département
- Sainte-Marguerite-sur-Duclair, in the Seine-Maritime département
- Sainte-Marguerite-sur-Fauville, in the Seine-Maritime département
- Sainte-Marguerite-sur-Mer, in the Seine-Maritime département

== See also ==
- Saint Margaret (disambiguation)
