= St. Margaret's Bay =

St. Margaret's Bay may refer to:

== Canada ==
- St. Margarets Bay, Nova Scotia on the South Shore of Nova Scotia
- St. Margaret's Bay, Nova Scotia (administrative district), a political division
- Head of St. Margarets Bay, Nova Scotia

== England ==
- St Margaret's at Cliffe, Kent

== Jamaica ==
- St. Margaret's Bay, Jamaica

== See also ==
- St. Margaret Bay, Newfoundland, Canada
