= Bucknall, Lincolnshire =

Village in Lincolnshire, England

Coordinates: 53.203649°N 0.240225°W

Bucknall
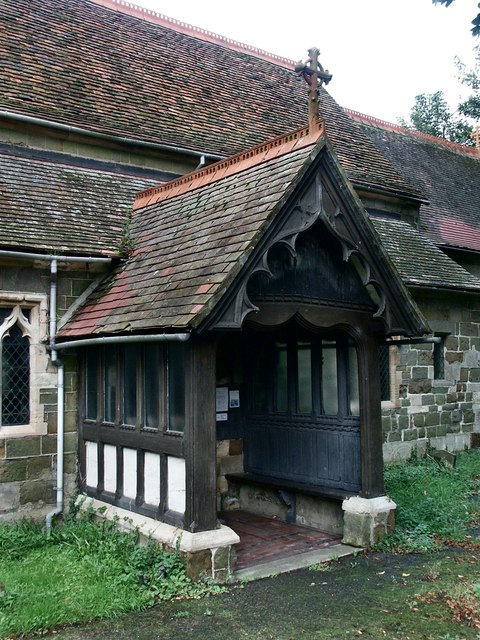
- Porch of St Margaret's Church, Bucknall

- Location within Lincolnshire
- Area: 17.54 km^{2} (6.77 sq mi)
- Population: 364 (including Tupholme, 2011)
  - Density: 21/km^{2} (54/sq mi)
- OS grid reference: TF176688
  - London: 115 mi (185 km) S
- District: East Lindsey
- Shire county: Lincolnshire
- Region: East Midlands
- Country: England
- Sovereign state: United Kingdom
- Post town: WOODHALL SPA
- Postcode district: LN10
- Dialling code: 01526
- Police: Lincolnshire
- Fire: Lincolnshire
- Ambulance: East Midlands
- UK Parliament: Louth and Horncastle

Bucknall is a village and civil parish in the East Lindsey district of Lincolnshire, England. The village is situated approximately 5 miles (8 km) west from Horncastle and 5 miles (8 km) north from Woodhall Spa.

== History ==
A Neolithic stone axe and Roman pottery fragment have been found around the village.

The first historical reference to the village is from the Saxon Charters of 806 AD, in which it is referred to as Bokenhale. In the Domesday Book of 1086 the name is spelt Buchehale. It seems likely that the village name means remote/hidden place where the goats are. 'Boken-'/'Buche-'/'Buckn-' could stem from 'bucca' an old English word for goat. 'Hale' is an old English word meaning a recess, nook, or remote valley. Other theories are that the village is named after a man with the old English name Bucca, that it's a reference to deer (buc in old English), or that it refers to beech trees (bok in old Norse).

It is claimed that the historical figure Lady Godiva was born in Bucknall around 995 AD; however several historians have declared the charter document used as evidence for this to be spurious.

Bucknall's Grade II* listed St Margaret's Church is dedicated to Margaret the Virgin. The west chancel of the church was restored in 1884 by James Fowler. The north nave and door, set within a later timber porch, are Early English gothic. The south nave is decorated gothic, and the font late Norman. The pulpit was given to the church in 1646, and there exists a 1787 chalice, flagon and paten by John Wakelin and William Taylor.

Four miles west of the village there is a ruined medieval abbey called Tupholme Abbey, which was built at a similar time to St. Margaret's Church.

Bucknall also has an 18th-century Grade II listed rectory, A post office previously existed adjacent to Nightingales Nursing Home. In the 1960s a farm in the village overwintered donkeys from Skegness beach. Since the 1990s two cattle farms within the village have been developed for housing. There was previously a farm shop opposite the church and a petrol station at the east end of the village.

== Geography and ecology ==
The village lies on the B1190, between Bardney and Horsington. It is between 7 and 13 metres above sea level. Two small streams in the village flow south to meet the River Witham. Farms around the village raise cattle and crops. Many birds typical of farmland are found in the village, including house sparrow, common starling and barn owl. Notable flora includes Verbascum thapsus, Tanacetum vulgare and Aesculus hippocastanum.

A road in the village bears two names. Signs at the mouth of the road say 'Chestnut Avenue' and 'Poplar Road', but on Ordnance Survey maps it is referred to only as 'Poplar Road'.

== Amenities ==
In the village there are a small primary school, a nursing home, post boxes, a village hall, a small park and public footpaths.
