= Church of St Margaret of Scotland =

The Church of St Margaret of Scotland may refer to:

- Church of St Margaret of Scotland, Woodville, Anglican church in Adelaide, South Australia
- Church of St Margaret of Scotland, Twickenham, Roman Catholic church in London
- St Margaret of Scotland, Aberdeen, Episcopal church
- St Margaret the Queen, Buxted, Anglican church in East Sussex, England
- St Margaret's Chapel, Edinburgh, chapel of Edinburgh Castle, Scotland
- Saint Margaret of Scotland Anglican Episcopal Church, Hungary

== See also ==
- St. Margaret's Church (disambiguation), for dedications to other saints
