= Margherita (disambiguation) =

Margherita is both a feminine given name and surname.

Margherita may also refer to:

== Places ==
- Margherita, Assam, India, a census town
- Fort Margherita, an old fort built in 1879 by Charles Brooke, Rajah of Sarawak
- The Italian name for Jamaame, a town in Somalia
- Margherita Peak, the highest point of Mount Stanley, the third highest mountain in Africa

== Other uses ==
- Margherita (opera), an 1848 opera by Italian composer Jacopo Foroni
- "Margherita" (song), a song by Riccardo Cocciante
- "Felicidad (Margherita)", a song by Boney M.
- Palazzo Margherita, a palazzo in Rome
- Pizza Margherita, a traditional Neapolitan pizza of tomatoes, cheese, and fresh basil
- Democracy is Freedom – The Daisy, (Democrazia è Libertà – La Margherita), a former Italian political party
- Margherita Hut, a mountain hut on Monte Rosa

== See also ==
- Margarita (disambiguation)
- Santa Margherita (disambiguation)
