= Church of St Margaret of Antioch, Bygrave =

Church of St Margaret of Antioch
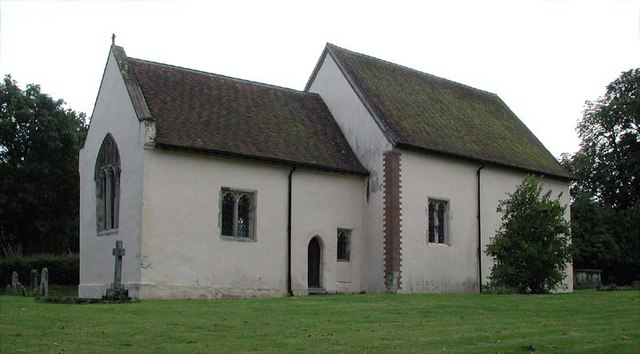
- Church of St Margaret of Antioch, Bygrave
- Church of St Margaret of Antioch
- 52.00919°N 0.15678°W
- OS grid reference: TL 26603 36134
- Location: Bygrave, Hertfordshire
- Country: England
- Denomination: Anglican

History
- Status: Parish church
- Dedication: St Margaret of Antioch

Architecture
- Functional status: Active
- Heritage designation: Grade II*
- Designated: 1968
- Years built: 12th to 15th century

Specifications
- Materials: Clunch, brick, flint

The Church of St Margaret of Antioch is the Anglican parish church for the village of Bygrave in Hertfordshire. Dedicated to St Margaret of Antioch, the church has been a Grade II* listed building since 1968 and comes under the Diocese of St Albans.

The site of the church dates from at least Saxon times with two phases of Saxon construction from the 8th to 10th centuries. Some Romano-British pottery, pre-dating the present church by several centuries, was found under the north nave wall during excavations in 1993 indicating a much earlier settlement on this site. Pevsner states that the bricks in the East angles of the nave are Roman. The walls are clunch with brick and flint rubble and are plastered. The chancel measures 25 ft. 6 in. by 14 ft. 6 in., the nave 31 ft. by 20 ft. 6 in., and the south porch 6 ft. by 5 ft., with all dimensions being measured internally. The nave is the earliest part of the church, and belongs to the 12th century, the chancel to the latter part of the 14th century, and the west turret to the 15th century, at which time windows were altered and the rood stair was built. On the south side of the chancel is a 14th-century moulded and arched piscina, and on the north side is an arched niche for a tomb.

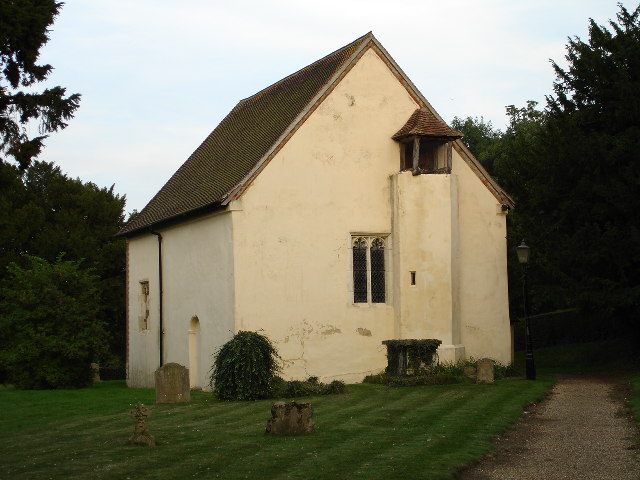
Exterior view showing the turret and bell chamber

The church has carvings of the ancient game of nine men's morris on the frames of the chancel windows. There are fragments of wall paintings on the West and North chancel walls that date from the 14th century. The nave has a window in each of its north, south and west walls consisting of two cinquefoiled lights under square heads. The glass is modern and includes a stained glass Millennium Window of 2001 by Michael Lassen. The north doorway has been blocked while the south doorway is of the 12th century, but has been considerably restored. The south porch dates to the 18th century. The small semi-octagonal turret against the west wall on the south side of the west window gives access to the bell, which is dated 1718.

The octagonal baptismal font is 15th century and stands on a square base. The sides of the basin have rectangular sunk panels, carved with the instruments of the Passion of Christ while round the stem are displayed angels holding shields. The font's wooden cover is Gothic of about the 18th century. The rood screen dates to the 15th century and has a carving of the Royal Arms on the cornice dating to the end of the 17th century. The altar and communion rails also date to the 17th century. The church has some 15th-century bench ends with poppy heads together with some plain old seating. A few fragments of 15th-century glass have been set in the nave windows.

The pulpit is Victorian but incorporates panels dating to the 15th century, while fixed to it is a 17th-century wrought-iron hour-glass stand. By the west wall of the churchyard is an old stone coffin without a lid.

A notable rector here was George Coke who went on to be the Bishop of Hereford.

The Church is open at weekends only and the key is available from the churchwardens.
