= St Margaret Clitherow's Church =

St Margaret Clitherow's Church is the name of:

- St Margaret Clitherow's Church, Great Ayton
- St Margaret Clitherow's Church, Haxby
- St Margaret Clitherow's Church, Threshfield

== See also ==
- 35 The Shambles, location of the Shrine of St Margaret Clitherow
