= Las Margaritas =

Las Margaritas may refer to:

- Las Margaritas, Chiapas, Mexico
- Las Margaritas (Madrid), Spain
- Las Margaritas, Panama
