= St. Margaret Bay =

Natural bay in Newfoundland and Labrador, Canada

Coordinates: 51.016°N 56.998°W

St. Margaret Bay is a natural bay off the island of Newfoundland in the province of Newfoundland and Labrador, Canada. It is located on the northwest coast of Newfoundland's Great Northern Peninsula.
