= Margarita (Valery Leontiev song) =

"Margarita " (Russian: Маргарита) is a Soviet song written by Yury Chernavsky and Alexander Markevich. It was written for the discotheque SPM Record in Luzhniki, Moscow. It was the first discotheque in the USSR for more than 10,000 people.

The first performer of the song was showman and disc-jockey Sergey Minaev. Later the song entered the repertoire of Valery Leontiev, who released it on album Wicked Way in 1990.

== Sergey Minaev version ==
"Margarita"

Song by Sergey Minaev

from the album Nazad v Buduchshee
- Released: 2002
- Recorded: 1986
- Studio: Yury Chernavsky's home studio
- Genre: Euro-disco
- Length: 4:21
- Label: Kvadro-Disc
- Songwriter(s): Yury Chernavsky, Alexander Markevich

Original version of the song was recorded by popular Soviet disc-jockey Sergey Minaev. Chernavsky was introduced to Minaev by sound engineer Vladimir Shirkin a few days before the recording.

The recording was made in 1986 in Chernavsky's home studio. Yuri attracted to the recording of backing vocals several famous singers with whom he was working at that time. Everyone was ready to help the young performer. The arrangements were recorded by Yuri in the then fashionable euro-disco style. During the same period Chernavsky recorded other songs with Minaev — "Shaman" and "Disco Princess". Subsequently, the composer recalled: "...Seryozha Minaev was extremely talented, efficient and bright, easy-going."

The song "Margarita" immediately became popular in Moscow clubs, spread across the country on samizdat "cassette singles" and became an All—Union hit.

Chernavsky's songs, including "Margarita", were not included in Minaev's albums until 2002, although included in his magnetoalbums; mastertapes being considered lost. In 2006, Minaev recorded a remix version for the album "Pirate of the XX century".

== Valery Leontiev version ==
"Margarita"

Song by Valery Leontiev

from the album Wicked Way
- Released: 1990
- Recorded: 1988–89
- Length: 5:20
- Label: Melodiya
- Songwriter(s): Yury Chernavsky, Alexander Markevich

In 1987, after Sergey Lisovsky, with the assistance of Chernavsky, organized SPM "Record", Minaev no longer collaborated with Yuri. In 1989, Chernavsky, without waiting for the release of the song on LPs, produced the recording of the second version of "Margarita" — with Valery Leontiev.

A month later, director Vadim Korotkov and co-director and screenwriter Yuri Grymov shot a music video, which received wide rotation on Soviet television. The role of Margarita was played by model Olga Anosova.

The song was the leader in the TV contest "Pesnya-89". and reached the highest ranks of the USSR charts.

=== Editions ===
- Album Wicked Way (1990)
- Album There, in September (1995)
- Album The years of wandering (2009)
- Album Best songs 1 (Valery Leontiev) (1999)
- Album Best songs 2 (Valery Leontiev) (1999)
- Album Golden Collection of Russia (Valery Leontiev) (2000)
- Album The BEST of Valery Leontiev (2001)

== Legacy ==
Valery Leontiev highly appreciated his work with Yuri Chernavsky on the song "Margarita" and other joint projects. Minaev described Chernavsky as "an underrated genius".

Afisha Daily, in the article "What is the post-Soviet sound?", cites the song as a vivid example of post-Soviet pop music (formally belonging to the Soviet era, the composition denies it in sound and subject matter) as well as "reading the night as a time of magical adventures", which has become one of the trends of post-Soviet pop music.
