= Margherita Gonzaga =

Margherita Gonzaga may refer to:

- Margherita Malatesta (1370–1399), wife of Francesco I Gonzaga
- Margherita Gonzaga, Marquise of Ferrara (1418–1439), first wife of Leonello d'Este, Marquis of Ferrara
- Margaret of Bavaria, Marchioness of Mantua (1442–1479), the wife of Federico I Gonzaga, Marquess of Mantua
- Margherita Gonzaga (1496–1496), daughter of Isabella d'Este and Francesco Gonzaga
- Margherita Paleologa (1510–1566), wife of Federico II Gonzaga
- Margherita Gonzaga, Duchess of Ferrara (1564–1618), also known as Margherita Gonzaga d'Este
- Margherita Farnese (1567–1643), wife of Vincenzo Gonzaga, Duke of Mantua
- Margaret of Savoy, Vicereine of Portugal (1589–1655), wife of Francesco IV Gonzaga
- Margherita Gonzaga, Duchess of Lorraine (1591–1632), eldest daughter of Vincenzo I Gonzaga and Eleonora de' Medici
