= Bygrave =

Village in Hertfordshire, England

Coordinates: 52.00952°N 0.15802°W

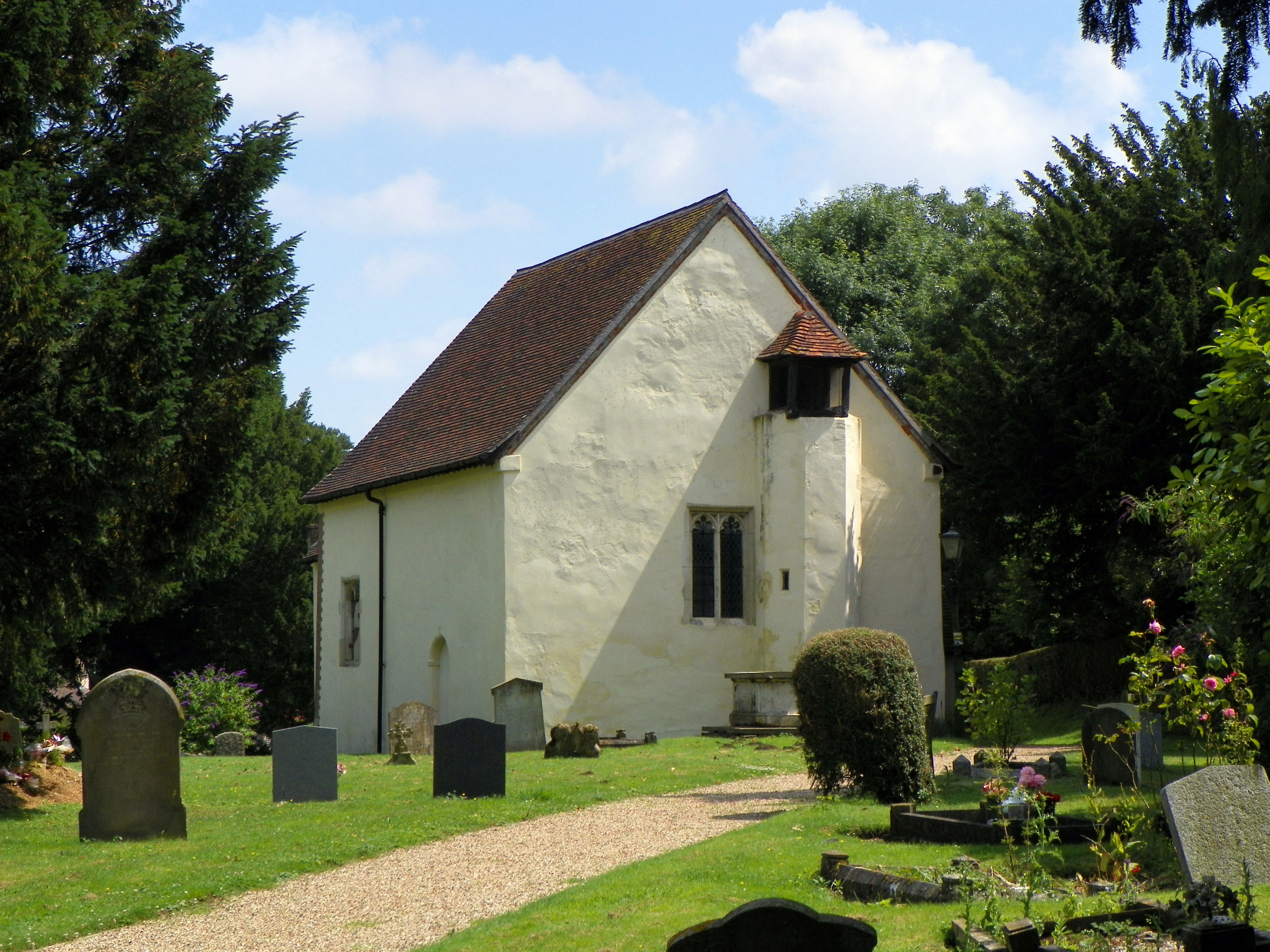
- St Margaret of Antioch Church

- Location within Hertfordshire
- Population: 289 (Parish, 2021)
- OS grid reference: TL265362
- Civil parish: Bygrave
- District: North Hertfordshire
- Shire county: Hertfordshire
- Region: East
- Country: England
- Sovereign state: United Kingdom
- Post town: Baldock
- Postcode district: SG7
- Dialling code: 01462
- Police: Hertfordshire
- Fire: Hertfordshire
- Ambulance: East of England
- UK Parliament: North East Hertfordshire

Bygrave is a village and civil parish in the North Hertfordshire district of Hertfordshire, England, about 2 miles (3 km) north-east of Baldock. At the 2021 census the parish had a population of 289.

== History ==
In the 10th century the parish was called Bigraffan and 11th to 16th centuries Bigrave.

The village church is St Margaret's and is dedicated to St Margaret of Antioch, while the site on which it stands dates from at least Saxon times with two phases of Saxon construction from 8th-10th centuries. Some Romano-British pottery, pre-dating the present church by several centuries was found under the north nave wall indicating a much earlier settlement on this site. This church has carvings of the ancient game of Nine Men Morris on the frames of the chancel windows. There are wall paintings that date from the mid fifteenth century. A notable rector here was George Coke who went on to be the bishop of Hereford. The church is open at weekends only and the key is available from the churchwardens.

The lane leading to the church was once the centre of a busy village and known as the Market Place and flourished between the 13th and 15th centuries. There was a 3-day annual fair beginning at the feast of St Margaret. The date was changed to Easter Monday and survived until Victorian times.

The Manor Farm has contributed much to the life of this village, from when most people living there were actually employed on the farm, to the present day. Sheep are still grazed on the Common.

== Geography ==
The village stands on a clay-capped hill, a defensive position where the original settlement was surrounded by moats built in 1386 which can still be seen today. From these defences, the whole parish bounded by Icknield Way, the Great North Road, the Cat Ditch and a ridge to the north would have been visible.

A reservoir is situated behind the Old Rectory and used for irrigation of potato crops by Manor Farm. There is also a tiny airfield used for microlight aircraft.

== Governance ==
There are three tiers of local government covering Bygrave, at parish, district, and county level: Bygrave Parish Council, North Hertfordshire District Council, and Hertfordshire County Council. The parish council generally meets at St Margaret's Church.

== Sport and Leisure ==
=== Croquet ===
Bygrave Croquet Club was based at The Moat House until 2017 when the owners of the property moved to Great Dunham, Norfolk.

=== Handbell Ringing ===
The Bygrave Handbell Ringers were formed in 1999 with the idea of ringing in the millennium. The team has 13 members and meets every week at The Moat House. They give many public performances in the community each year including the Carol Service at St Margaret's Church on Christmas Eve. Their strangest concert was in the Baldock Bypass tunnel before it was opened to traffic in 2006.
