= Margaret Lake =

Margaret Lake could refer to:

== Lakes and reservoirs ==
- Lake Margaret Dam, a dam and reservoir in Australia
- Margaret Lake, Alberta, location of the Margaret Lake Airport, Alberta, Canada
- Margaret Lake, Manitoba, a lake on the Winnipeg River, Manitoba, Canada
- Margaret Lake (Glacier County, Montana)
- Margaret Lake (Kittitas County, Washington)

== People ==
- Margaret Lake, real name of British astrologer Mystic Meg (1942–2023)
- Maʻiki Aiu Lake (1925–1984), a hula dancer and influential figure in the second Hawaiian Renaissance
