= St Margaret's Uniting Church =

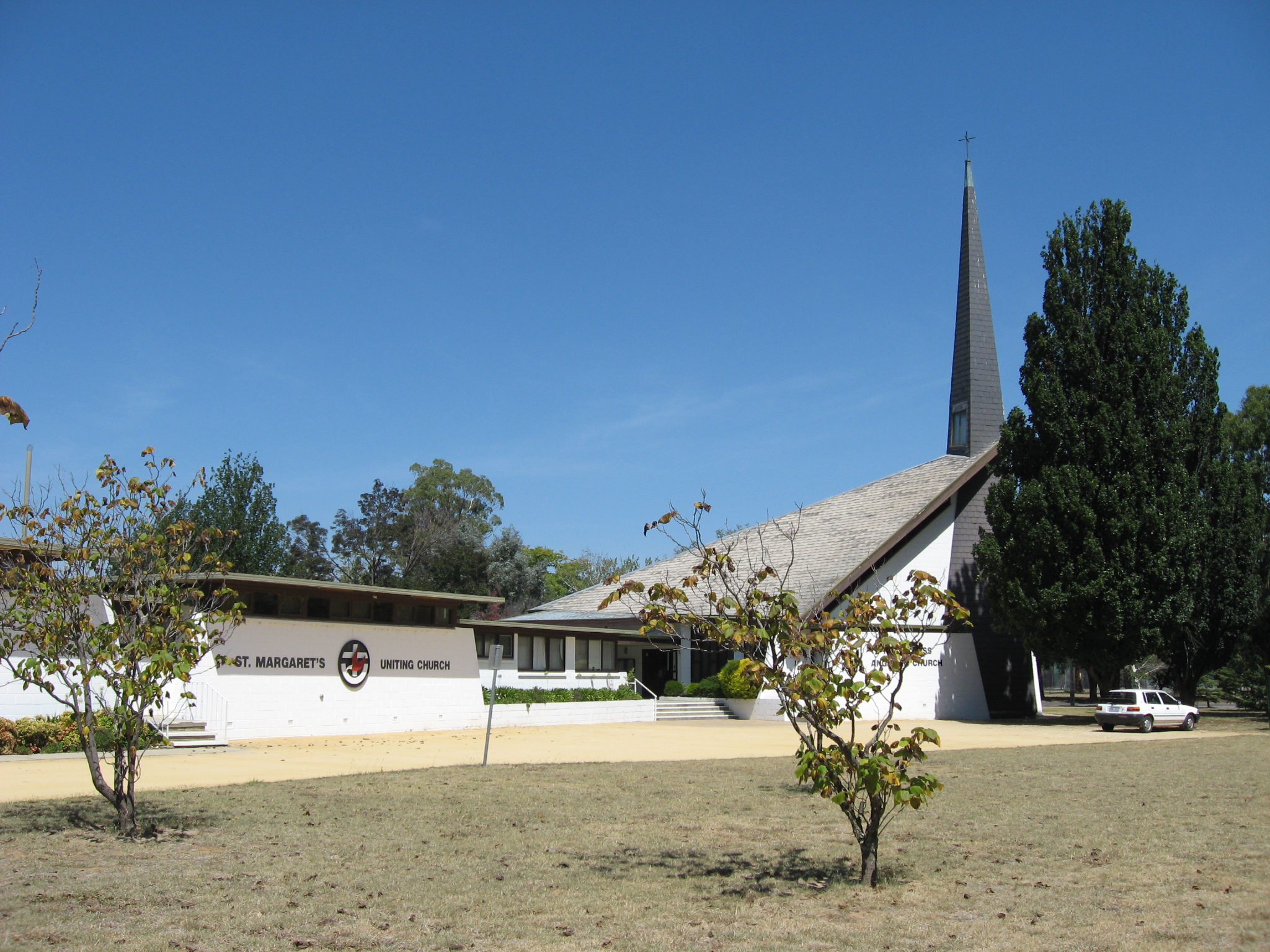
- St Margaret's Uniting Church
- 35°14′51″S 149°09′18″E
- Location: Corner Antill Street and Phillip Ave., Hackett, Canberra, Australian Capital Territory
- Country: Australia
- Denomination: Uniting (since 1977)
- Previous denomination: Concurrently (1964 – 1977): Methodist; Presbyterian
- Churchmanship: Liberal Protestantism
- Website: stmargs.unitingchurch.org.au

History
- Status: Church
- Founded: 1964
- Dedication: St Margaret of Scotland
- Dedicated: 16 December 1967

Architecture
- Functional status: Active
- Architectural type: Church

St Margaret's Uniting Church is a Uniting church in Hackett, Australian Capital Territory, Australia.

The church shares a spire with Holy Cross Anglican congregation, and is a major landmark in North Canberra, at the intersection of the four suburbs of Watson, Dickson, Downer and Hackett.

== History ==
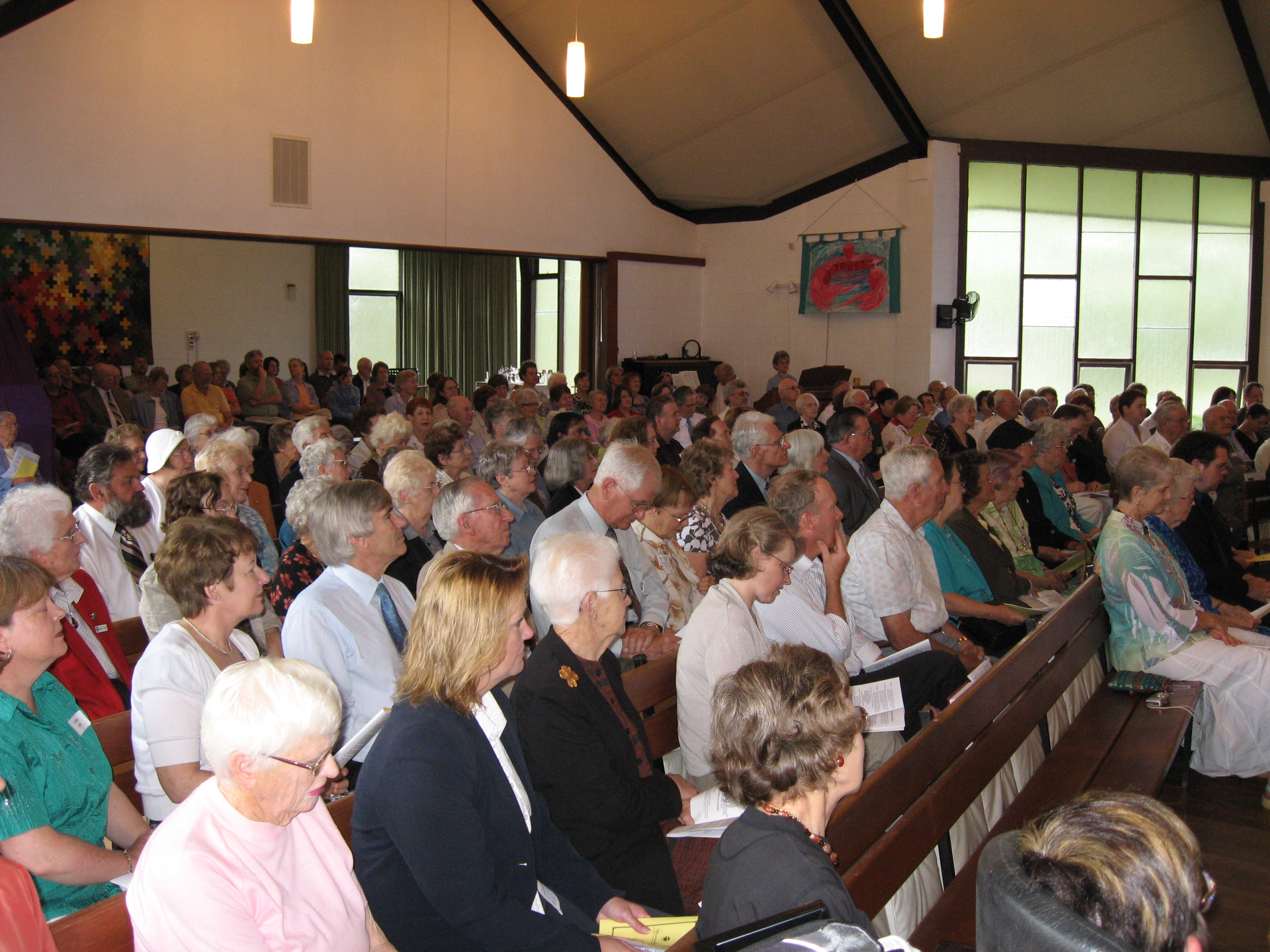
40th anniversary celebration marking dedication of Holy Cross Anglican Church and St Margaret's Uniting Church, Hackett.

St Margaret's Uniting Church, together with Holy Cross Anglican Church, are the only remaining congregations from different denominations in the Australian Capital Territory to continue to share a church, hall and grounds, and on occasions ministers and even services.

The Church was founded in 1964 as a shared congregation of the Methodist and Presbyterian churches in the then newly built North Canberra suburbs of Watson, Dickson, Downer and Hackett. In doing so it predated by over a decade the family of churches it now belongs to, the Uniting Church in Australia, which was formed in 1977 when the Congregational, Methodist and Presbyterian churches came together.

Services were initially held in school rooms until the completion and official dedication of the church building on 16 December 1967.

It faces the Signadou Canberra Campus of the Australian Catholic University, built in 1963 as the Dominican Sisters' Teacher Training College, across Antill Street.

The church is home to Meg's Toybox, the major toy library for North Canberra, and the Stepping Stones for Life disability support organisation.

== Tradition ==
Worship at St Margaret's is in the liberal Protestant tradition of the Uniting Church in Australia.
