= St Margaret's Church, Bucknall =

Church in Bucknall, Lincolnshire, England

- St Margaret's Church, Bucknall
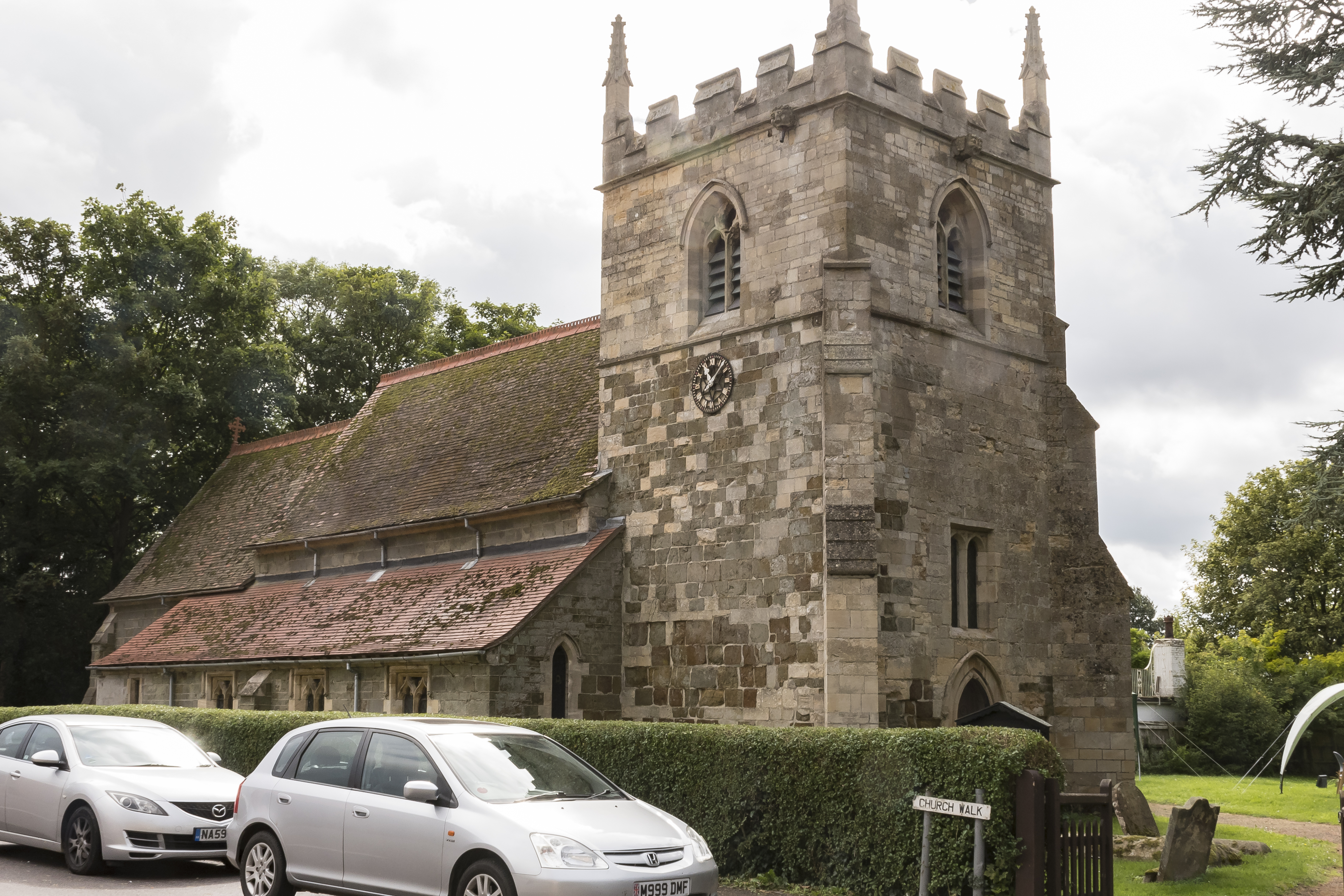
- St Margaret's Church, Bucknall
- St Margaret's Church, Bucknall
- 53.204113°N 0.251766°W
- OS grid reference: TF 16900 68863
- Location: Bucknall, Lincolnshire
- Country: England
- Denomination: Church of England
- Website: woodhallspa.group/bucknall

History
- Status: Active
- Dedication: Saint Margaret the Virgin of Antioch
- Dedicated: 13th Century
- Events: 1884 (Church restored) & 1912 (Tower restored)

Architecture
- Architect: James Fowler (Late Victorian period)
- Architectural type: Norman
- Groundbreaking: £1,326

Administration
- Province: Canterbury
- Diocese: Lincoln
- Archdeaconry: Lincoln
- Deanery: Horncastle
- Parish: Bucknall with Tupholme

St Margaret's Church, Bucknall is a Grade II* listed parish church in the village of Bucknall, Lincolnshire, England.

== History and description ==
St Margaret's has been described as "partly 13th century with traces of Norman and the external features mainly Victorian." The church was originally built in the 13th century. The two arcades of four bays are of this time, while the font was installed in 1646. The church saw extensive restorations to the main building and tower between 1884 and 1912. It remains an active place of worship: as of April 2024 there were two regular monthly services and occasional other services. Bucknall is one of five Anglican parishes in the Woodhall Spa Group of Churches, in the Deanery of Horncastle. The group serves the rural villages of Woodhall Spa and Kirkstead, Stixwould and Woodhall, Horsington, Langton, and Bucknall.

Historic England gave the church Grade II* listed status in 1966. Nicholas Antram, in his revised Lincolnshire volume in the Pevsner Buildings of England series, revised and reissued in 2002, notes that the church's exterior is almost entirely the work of James Fowler in his Victorian restoration, but that the interior contains more original work.

== Sources ==
- Pevsner, Nikolaus; Harris, John; Antram, Nicholas (2002). Lincolnshire. The Buildings of England. New Haven, US and London: Yale University Press. ISBN 9780300096200. OCLC 49298889.
