= Lady Margaret =

Lady Margaret may refer to:

== People ==
- Lady Margaret Fortescue (1923–2013), one of the UK's largest private landowners
- Margaret Beaufort, Countess of Richmond and Derby (1443–1509), mother of King Henry VII
- Margaret French McLean, First Lady of North Carolina

== Other uses ==
- "Fair Margaret and Sweet William", also known as "Lady Margaret", a traditional English ballad
- Lady Margaret Boat Club, the rowing club for members of St John's College, Cambridge
- Lady Margaret Hall, Oxford, a constituent college of the University of Oxford
- Lady Margaret School, a secondary school in Parsons Green, Fulham, London
- Lady Margaret (ward), electoral ward of Ealing, London

== See also ==
- Margaret, the name
- Margaret Thatcher (1925–2013), the Baroness Thatcher, former Prime Minister of the United Kingdom
