= George Coke =

Bishop of Bristol and Hereford (1570–1646)

The Right Reverend George Coke
- Bishop of Bristol and Hereford
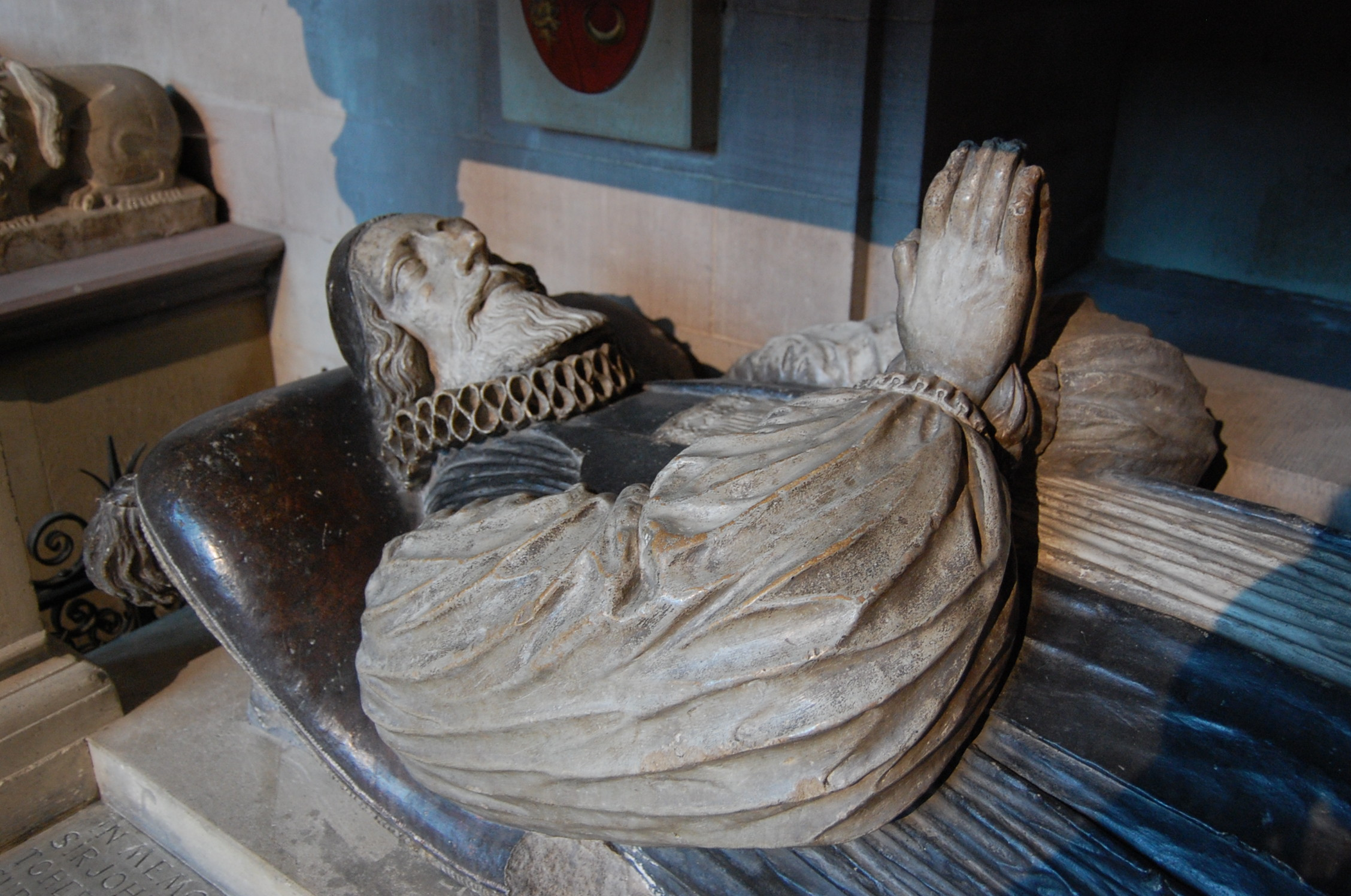
- Effigy in Hereford Cathedral

Personal details
- Born: 3 October 1570 Longford, Derbyshire
- Died: 1646 (aged 75–76) Quedgeley, Gloucestershire or Eardisley, Herefordshire
- Denomination: Anglican
- Spouse: Jane Heigham (m.)
- Children: five sons
- Education: St John's College, Cambridge

George Coke or Cooke (3 October 1570 – 10 December 1646) was successively the Bishop of Bristol and Hereford. After the battle of Naseby in 1645, Hereford was taken and Coke was arrested and taken to London. He avoided charges of High Treason in January 1646 and died in Gloucestershire that year.

== Biography ==
Coke was the son of Richard and Mary Coke of Trusley, Derbyshire. His mother was the heiress of Thomas Sacheverell of Kirkby-in-Ashfield, Nottinghamshire, and his brother was to become Sir John Coke, Secretary of State.

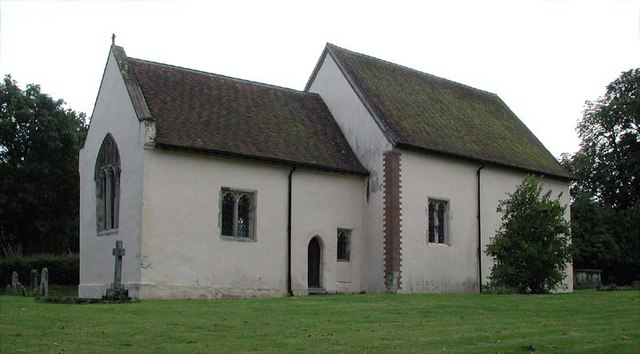
St Margaret's of Antioch – the church in the small village of Bygrave

Coke was educated at St John's College, Cambridge. He took his BA in 1593 and proceeded MA 1596. He then obtained a fellowship at Pembroke College in 1597, became a lecturer in rhetoric in 1602 and in 1605 he was Junior Taxor of the university. He was ordained both deacon and priest on 30 November 1602 by the Bishop of Ely. In 1608 he became the rector of Bygrave in Hertfordshire, which was then described as "a lean village (consisting of but three houses) maketh a fat living", as it provided a considerable income of almost £300 a year. Coke resigned his fellowship in late 1609, and by 9 January 1610 he had married Jane Heigham, and they had five sons: Richard, John and William all entered the church and had associations with Herefordshire. Their fourth son, Thomas, died young, while the last, Robert, was "killed in action in Newport".

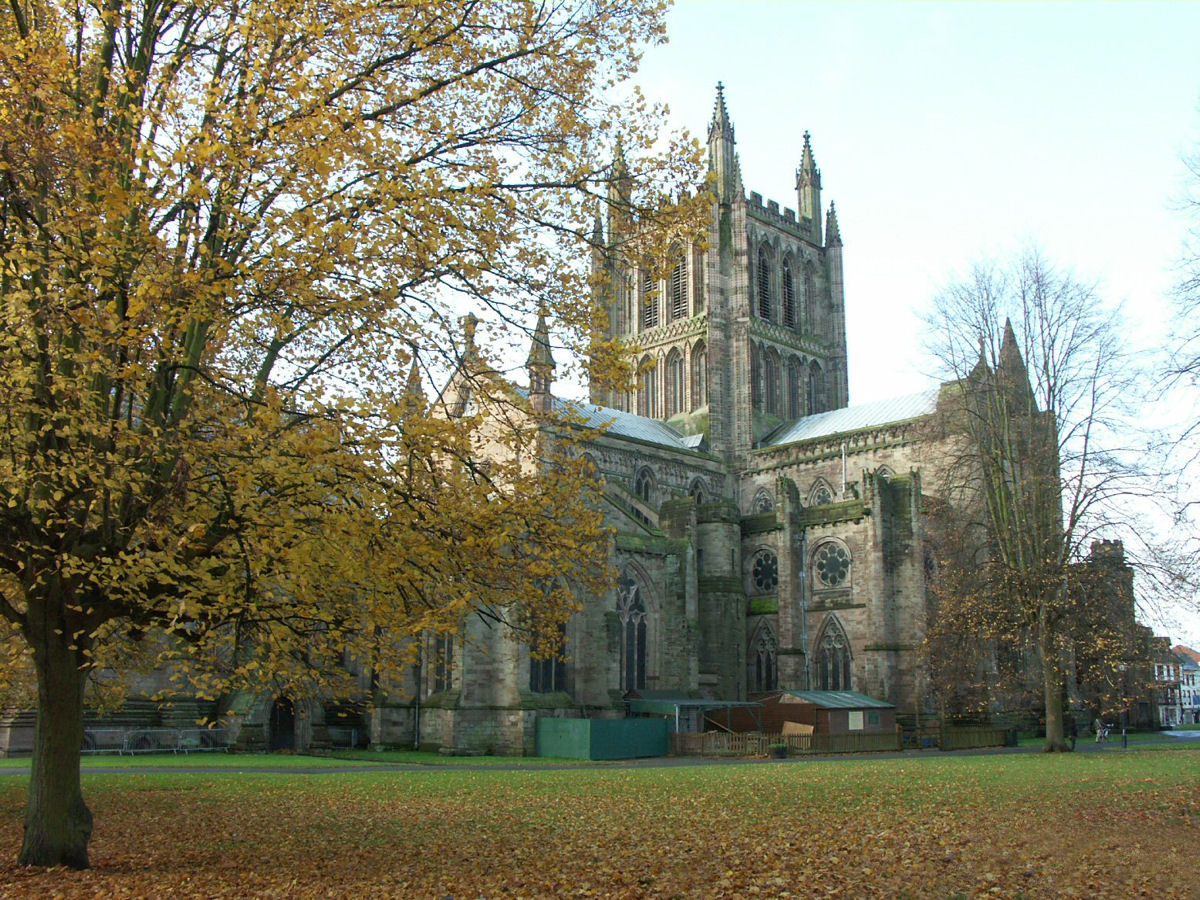
Hereford cathedral

Following his brother's elevation to high office in 1625, Coke was collated to the prebend of Finsbury on 19 January 1626, making him one of the canons of St Paul's Cathedral, and he was made a Doctor of Divinity in 1630. On 10 February 1633, Coke was consecrated Bishop of Bristol. In June 1635 he was instituted as rector of Maiden Newton, Dorset, to which he was presented by Martin White and Sir John Windham despite the opposition of Sir John Strangeways who believed the advowson was his. In July 1636 he was translated to Hereford, resigning Bygrave and his prebendary. The appointments to both Bristol and Hereford seem to have had the support of the Archbishop of Canterbury, William Laud, but during Coke's time at Hereford, he was rebuked by Laud after Coke had appointed one of his own son's as Precentor of Hereford Cathedral. The son had been apprenticed but ran away to sea, seeing a severe storm as a sign from God, he then sought ordination from his father. Laud believed the son to have insufficient learning for a cathedral post. Coke replaced his own son with his nephew, Francis, son of Coke's eldest brother, Sir Francis. Coke bought the estate of Lower Moor in Herefordshire from Henry, 5th Earl of Worcester. This house was to remain in the Coke family until the 1930s.

== Civil war ==
During the civil war he was one of the protesting bishops, and was imprisoned on that account. On 30 December 1641 he was impeached by the House of Commons together with eleven other bishops to weaken the Royalist party in the House of Lords. Coke retired to Hereford, and was there in 1643 when it was first captured by parliamentary forces, but the articles of surrender protected his position.

After Naseby, the city was captured for the second time, the forces this time led by Colonel John Birch. Birch and Colonel Morgan took a number of people captive on 8 December 1645, including Coke, Judge Jenkins, Sir Henry Bedingfield, Sir Walter Blunt, Sir Henry Miller, Sir Marmaduke and Sir Francis Lloyd, Giles Mompesson, Sir Nicholas Throgmorton, and others who were initially taken to Gloucester. On 3 January 1646, Coke and others were ordered to London by the Commons and many were sent to the Tower on the 22nd to answer charges of high treason. Birch rifled the bishop's palace and afterwards took up his habitation there until the Restoration. Moreover, he had a great part of the revenues of the diocese to his own use, and John Walker complained in 1714 that "to this day, the manor of Whitborn, by the sorry compliance of some who might have prevented it, continues in his family". Coke's estate of Queest Moor was sequestred on 13 August 1646, and despite his always frugal habits, he was forced to rely on the charity of other family members. He was deprived of his See of Carlisle by Parliament on 9 October 1646, as episcopacy was abolished for the duration of the Commonwealth and the Protectorate. Coke died on 10 December 1646, at either Quedgeley, Gloucestershire, or Eardisley and was buried in Eardisley parish church. After the Restoration of 1660, a handsome cenotaph was erected to his memory in Hereford Cathedral, which was much altered in the 19th century.

Church of England titles
Preceded by Robert Wright	Bishop of Bristol; 1633–1636	Succeeded by Robert Skinner
Preceded by Theophilus Field	Bishop of Hereford; 1636–1646	Succeeded by abolished, next held by Nicholas Monck from 1660
