= Sainte-Marguerite-de-l'Autel =

- Part of Le Lesme
- Location of Sainte-Marguerite-de-l'Autel
- Location within France Location within Normandy
- Coordinates: 48°54′03″N 0°51′19″E
- Country: France
- Region: Normandy
- Department: Eure
- Arrondissement: Bernay
- Canton: Breteuil
- Commune: Le Lesme
- Area^{1}: 23.27 km^{2} (8.98 sq mi)
- Elevation: 185 m (607 ft)
- Highest elevation: 193 m (633 ft)
- Lowest elevation: 149 m (489 ft)
- Population (2019): 577
  - Density: 24.8/km^{2} (64.2/sq mi)
- Time zone: UTC+01:00 (CET)
  - Summer (DST): UTC+02:00 (CEST)
- Postal code: 27160
- ^{1} French Land Register data, which excludes lakes, ponds, glaciers > 1 km^{2} (0.386 sq mi or 247 acres) and river estuaries.

Sainte-Marguerite-de-l'Autel (French pronunciation: [sɛ̃t maʁɡəʁit də lotɛl]) is a former commune in the Eure department in Normandy in northern France. On 1 January 2016, it was merged into the new commune of Le Lesme.

== See also ==
- Communes of the Eure department
