= St Margaret's School =

St Margaret's School may refer to:

== Australia ==
- St Margaret's School, Melbourne
- St Margaret's Anglican Girls' School, Brisbane

== Brunei ==
- St. Margaret's School, Brunei

== Canada ==
- St. Margaret's School (Victoria, British Columbia)

== China ==
- St. Margaret's Co-educational English Secondary and Primary School, Hong Kong

== Singapore ==
- St. Margaret's Primary School
- St. Margaret's Secondary School

== United Kingdom ==
- St Margaret's Primary School, Horsforth, England
- St Margaret's School, Bushey, Hertfordshire, England
- St Margaret's School, Edinburgh, Scotland
- St Margaret's School for Girls, Aberdeen, Scotland
- St Margaret's School Hampstead, London

== United States ==
- St. Margaret's Episcopal School, California
- Saint Margaret School (Pearl River, New York)
- St. Margaret of Cortona School, the Bronx, New York
- St. Margaret's School (Virginia)
- St. Margaret's School for Girls in Waterbury, Connecticut, which merged into what became Chase Collegiate School

== See also ==
- St Margaret's Academy, Livingston, West Lothian, Scotland
- St Margaret's Church of England Academy, Liverpool, England
- St Margaret's College (disambiguation)
- St. Margaret's Junior College, Tokyo, Japan
- Benilde-St. Margaret's, St. Louis Park, Minnesota, United States
