= Margaret Creek =

Margaret Creek is a stream and state waterway in Athens and Meigs Counties, Ohio. Along with Monday, Sunday, and Federal Creeks, Margaret Creek is a principal tributary to the Hocking River. The confluence with the Hocking River is on the west side of the city of Athens, Ohio. The stream was named after Margaret Snowden, the first white woman settler in Athens County.

== History ==
During the period of 1–1000 AD, population shifts occurred toward the riverine and flood plain resources at Margaret Creek. The Allen Site on a terrace above Margaret Creek was the location of a Late Prehistoric period (AD 600-1300) sequence of villages including residential areas either side of the creek and a community pottery production locus. Radiocarbon dating of wood charcoal and botanical materials identified the settlement as predominantly associated with the late Late Woodland or emergent Fort Ancient culture. Maize remains indicated a substantially agricultural economy and diet.

A number of emigrants arrived in Athens and in Alexander township in 1798. Among them were Joseph and Margaret Snowden; the creek was named in her honor. Another early pioneer of the Midwest was Isaac Coe (1801–1873) who farmed next to Margaret Creek for a number of years. John and Moses Hewitt were noted for poling "broadhorns" up the Hocking River to Margaret Creek. In 1800, John Hewitt built the first watermill on Margaret's Creek, about a mile above its mouth.

In 1966, the Margaret's Creek Watershed Conservancy District and the Division of Wildlife began acquiring land to build a dam in the mid-1960s. It was constructed between 1967 and 1968. The Margaret Creek Conservancy District Reservoir is located at 39.2508019°N 82.1234181°W. The Margaret Creek Structure No. 6 was completed in 1967. Owned by Hocking Conservancy District, it is purposed for flood control and recreation. Lake Snowden was created in 1970 after a branch of Margaret Creek was dammed for flood control. In addition to Lake Snowden, the Margaret Creek Conservancy lakes include Meeks Lake, Fox Lake, and two others.

== Geography ==
The early geographic history of the region suggests that the Athens basin drained from the Athens col into the valley at the mouth of Margaret Creek. The erosion of a large portion of the Athens Valley was probably due to river flow attempting to follow a line down to the Margaret Creek Valley. The Albany Valley followed southward up the Margaret Creek Valley. The Albany Valley is now the headwater district for the Margaret Creek drainage that itself flows to the Hocking.

Margaret Creek is approximately 50 feet (15 m) in width. It drains the eastern and northeastern sections of Lee Township.

There are few rock outcrops, and the hillsides are characterized by gentle slopes that are covered with a thick soil mantle. The minerals hematite and siderite are found at Margaret Creek.

== See also ==
- List of rivers of Ohio
