= SS St Margaret =

A number of steamships were named St Margaret, including –

- SS St Margaret (1913), a British cargo ship torpedoed and sunk in 1917,
- SS St Margaret (1936), a British cargo ship torpedoed and sunk in 1943,
- SS St Margaret (1941), a British cargo ship in service 1946–60
