= Santa Margarita =

Santa Margarita, Spanish for Saint Margaret, may refer to:

== Places ==
=== United States ===
- Santa Margarita, California, a town in San Luis Obispo County
  - Santa Margarita de Cortona Asistencia, an 18th-century mission near the town
  - Santa Margarita Lake
- Rancho Santa Margarita, California, a city in Orange County
  - Santa Margarita Catholic High School, in Rancho Santa Margarita
- Santa Margarita Formation, a geologic formation in the San Joaquin Valley, California
- Santa Margarita Mountains, San Diego County, California
- Santa Margarita River, in the Santa Ana Mountains, California

=== Other countries ===
- Santa Margarita Island, Magdalena Bay, Baja California Sur, Mexico
- Santa Margarita, Samar, Philippines
- Santa Margarita (La Línea de la Concepción), a gated community in the Province of Cadiz, Andalucia, Spain
- Santa Margarita, Trinidad and Tobago

== Other uses ==
- Santa Margarita (shipwreck), a shipwreck near Key West off the coast of Florida, US
- Santa Margarita Stakes, an American Thoroughbred horse race at Santa Anita Park in California, US

== See also ==
- Margarita (disambiguation)
- Saint Margaret (disambiguation)
- Santa Margalida, Mallorca, Spain
- Santa Margerita, Mosta, Malta
- Santa Margerita Chapel, in San Gwann, Malta
- Santa Margherita (disambiguation)
