= Margaret Lartey =

Ghanaian professor

Margaret Y. M. Lartey is a Ghanaian professor of medicine and dermatology, and Dean of the School of Medicine and Dentistry of the University of Ghana. She is known, along with Rashmi Sarkar, for her work in dismissing myths and misinformation about skin care and disease. She was the first female dermatologist to head the Ghana Society of Dermatology.
