= Rashmi Sarkar =

Indian professor

Rashmi Sarkar, MD, FAMS is an Indian professor and Head of dermatology at the Vardhman Mahavir Medical College and Safdarjung hospital, New Delhi, India. She was born in Lucknow, India and is from Chandigarh, India. She did her MBBS from Dayanand Medical College, Ludhiana and MD Dermatology, Venereology and Leprology from Post Graduate Institute of Medical Education and Research (PGIMER), Chandigarh. She is a teacher in Dermatology for last 28 years. Also known globally for her publications on Pigmentary Disorders especially melasma and Pediatric dermatology.She is known, along with Margaret Lartey, for her work in dismissing myths and misinformation about skin care and disease. She has worked globally in many Dermatology societies including the International Society of Dermatology (ISD), Women's Dermatologic Society(WDS), Skin of Color Society(SOCS), International League of Dermatological Societies (ILDS) as Board of Directors. She was the first woman Secretary General and second woman President in Indian Association of Dermatologists', Venereologist s and Leprologists(IADVL), the second largest Dermatology association in the world. She ranks in the top 2 percent scientists in Dermatology in Stanford ranking list for single year citation for 2024,2025.She is the Founder President of Indian Women's Dermatologic Association (IWDA) and Founder of Pigmentary Disorders Society (PDS).
