= Ghana Society of Dermatology =

The Ghana Society of Dermatology is a learned society focussed on skin conditions, established in 2012 and based in Ghana.
