= Fox Studio Lot =

Television studio and corporate office located in Los Angeles, California

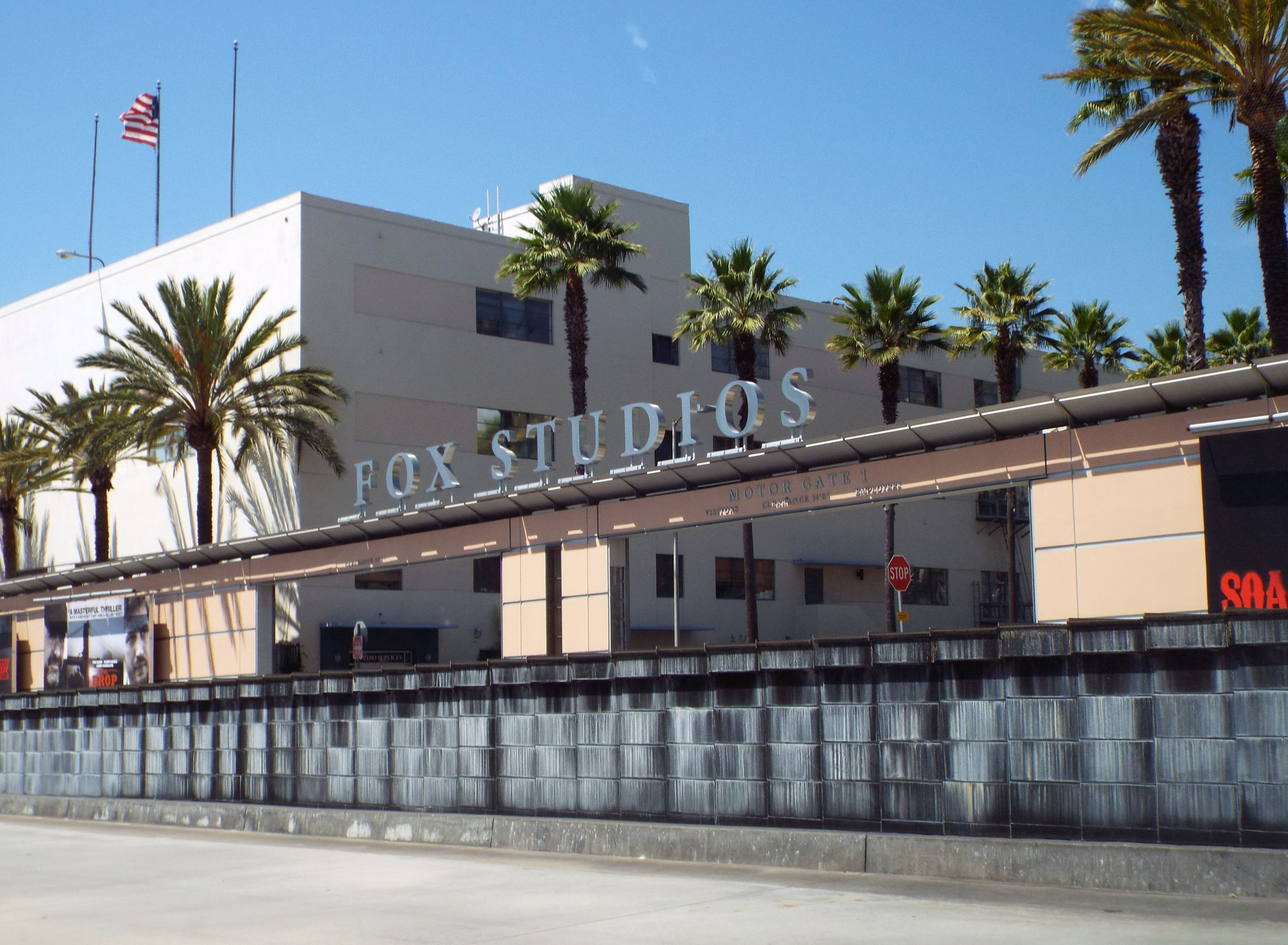
- Former names: Movietone City; Twentieth Century Fox Film Studio
- Alternative names: Fox Studios

General information
- Type: Film and television production studio Corporate offices
- Location: 10201 West Pico Boulevard; Los Angeles, California; 48037
- Coordinates: 34.051306°N 118.410417°W
- Current tenants: Fox Broadcasting Company; Fox Entertainment; Fox Entertainment Studios; Fox Sports
- Opening: 1928; 98 years ago
- Owner: Fox Corporation

Website
- foxstudiolot.com

The Fox Studio Lot, also known as Fox Studios, is a film and television production complex located in the Century City neighborhood of Los Angeles, California. Owned by Fox Corporation, the complex is home to the Fox Network Center, a broadcast facility for the Fox television network. The center also serves as the headquarters and flagship studio production facility for Fox Sports, including Fox Sports 1, Fox Sports 2, Fox Sports Interactive Media, and Fox Deportes. The studio lot features 80 buildings, including soundstages, backlot sets, television production and programming facilities, executive offices and support facilities.

The complex was originally the historic home of the 20th Century Fox film studio, housing the studio's production and broadcasting facilities as well as those of its subsequent corporate divisions, including 20th Television, 20th Television Animation, FX Networks, and Searchlight Pictures. Following Disney's acquisition of these assets on March 20, 2019, the divisions eventually relocated to the Walt Disney Studios lot complex in Burbank, six years after the acquisition.

The complex also formerly housed broadcasting facilities for Fox Sports Networks which departed in 2012.

== History ==
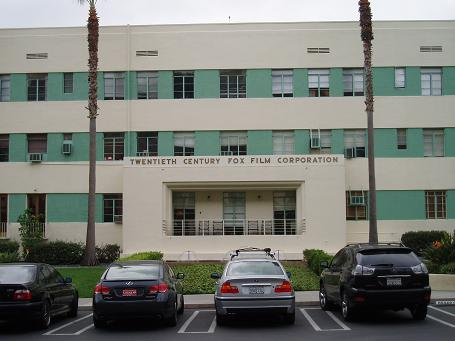
Former executive building for 20th Century Fox inside the Fox Studios Lot.

The complex first opened in 1928 as Fox Movietone City, after William Fox acquired 99 acres from Janss Investment Compnay and Tom Mix in 1924 and to establish a production facility for the Fox Film Corporation. Stage 6 was built in 1930. Fox Film merged with Twentieth Century Pictures in 1935, forming 20th Century-Fox. At its peak, the lot covered 285 acres.

In the 1950s, 20th Century-Fox president Spyros Skouras began to sell parcels of the lot to offset the studio's debts, which worsened during the production of Cleopatra (1963). In 1960, Skouras auctioned 176 acres of the lot's northern property; the following year William Zeckendorf and the Aluminum Company of America purchased the land from 20th Century-Fox for $43 million and demolished the on-site soundstages and bungalows. That land was developed into Century City, a corporate, retail, and residential district of Los Angeles whose name was derived from that of the studio.

In 1967, the backlot’s New York Street was constructed for the production of Hello, Dolly! (1969), after filming on location in modern-day New York City was deemed impractical for a story set in the 1890s. The set took four months to build and cost an estimated $2.25 million. Like many film sets, New York Street was originally intended to be temporary; however, the studio sought to recoup its investment by preserving the streetscape and leasing it to other studios for filming. Over the years, the set has appeared in numerous films and television productions, including Up the Sandbox (1972), New York, New York (1977), Charlie’s Angels (1976–1981), and Moonlighting (1985–1989).

Following the launch of the Fox Broadcasting Company in 1986, the network had maintained offices at the complex while retaining its primary Los Angeles offices at Metromedia Square in Los Angeles. Following the expiration of the network's lease, Fox moved its television network headquarters to the complex beginning in 1997. In 1998, Fox Sports moved its headquarters to the complex along with Fox Sports Net.

Following the completion of The Walt Disney Company's acquisition of 21st Century Fox, the company retained the complex as part of a seven-year lease. Since 2021, the complex's Fox Network Center exists in a disaster recovery role for the master control operations of Fox's national sports and entertainment networks, which are primarily transmitting from the Fox Technology Center in Tempe, Arizona.

On March 16, 2023, Fox announced the Fox Future Studio Lot project which would redevelop parts of the complex to construct new production facilities and an office complex. As part of the investment, New York Street was completely rebuilt, combining the architectural character of mid-20th-century Lower Manhattan with modern production capabilities. The redesigned set includes electrical conduits connected to the studio’s power supply to avoid the use of generators, as well as thousands of square feet of integrated interior space behind the exterior façades, allowing productions to seamlessly film both inside and outside the structures.

On April 1, 2025, Disney announced that it would vacate the complex by the end of the year, bringing 20th Century Studios’ 97-year presence and relationship with the lot to an end.

In November 2025, Fox announced plans to split up the complex as part of a $1.5 billion redevelopment plan to construct nine new soundstages along with upgrades to several production facilities and to construct an office tower as part of its Fox Future project. During the 2026 FIFA World Cup, the Fox Studio Lot served as a broadcasting hub for Fox Sports' coverage of the tournament.
