= Anatolii Kasianov =

Ukrainian technology entrepreneur (born 1995)

- Анатолій Касьянов
- Born: 27 October 1995 (age 30); Ukraine
- Occupations: Entrepreneur; software developer
- Years active: 2020–present
- Known for: Co-founding Holywater Tech
- Title: Co-founder and co-CEO of HOLYWATER TECH

Anatolii Kasianov (born 27 October 1995) is a Ukrainian technology entrepreneur and software developer, known as the co-founder and co-chief executive officer (Co-CEO) of Holywater Tech, a global technology company specializing in AI-first entertainment products.

== Early life and education ==
Kasianov studied at a physics-and-mathematics lyceum, where he learned to program and began taking freelance development projects. He later moved to the United Kingdom to study under the International Baccalaureate Diploma Programme, leaving the programme after two years.

== Career ==
Kasianov began his career as a freelance developer and subsequently worked at an outsourcing company. In March 2020 he co-founded Holywater Tech in Kyiv together with Bogdan Nesvit, initially working as an iOS developer. He later became the company's chief technology officer. Five applications were released by the end of 2020. In 2021 the company shifted toward a content ecosystem with the launch of the e-book application My Passion. In 2022 it sold its earlier application portfolio.

Under Kasianov and Nesvit, Holywater Tech grew from a seven-person team into a company of more than 200 employees.

In March 2024 Kasianov co-launched My Drama, Holywater Tech's vertical series streaming platform, which distributes episodes of roughly one to two minutes. By 2025 the platform carried more than 90 original series with four to six new releases per month. The company's ecosystem also includes the e-book platform My Passion, the generative-AI series platform My Muse. In 2025 Kasianov received a Globee Leadership Award.

In October 2025, Fox Entertainment acquired an equity stake in the company. As part of the agreement, Fox committed to producing a slate of more than 200 original microdrama and vertical series titles for the company's applications.

That same year, Kasianov provided financial assistance to Veteran Hub, enabling the center to resume operations and continue supporting over 1,000 veterans and their families.

In January 2026 the company raised $22 million in a round led by Horizon Capital, with participation from Endeavor Catalyst and Wheelhouse. The round was reported as the largest disclosed investment in the microdrama sector outside Asia.

On 26 January 2026, Fox Entertainment, Dhar Mann Studios and Holywater Tech announced a multi-year agreement under which Dhar Mann Studios would produce an initial slate of 40 narrative vertical titles. The titles were to premiere on My Drama before worldwide distribution by Fox Entertainment Global. By 2026, the platform carried more than 300 series, with four to six new releases per month.

On 9 February 2026 the company announced the acquisition of Jeynix, an AI-assisted visual effects studio founded in 2025 by Yevhen Nemyr, and rebranded itself as Holywater Tech.

=== Film work ===
In 2025 Kasianov co-produced the AI-assisted short film Distance Between Two Points Of Me, directed by Illya Dutsyk. The film was selected as an honoree at the Runway AI Film Festival. At the AI International Film Festival 2025 it received a nomination for Best AI Short Film and an honourable mention.
