= Dhar Mann =

American entrepreneur and film producer (born 1984)

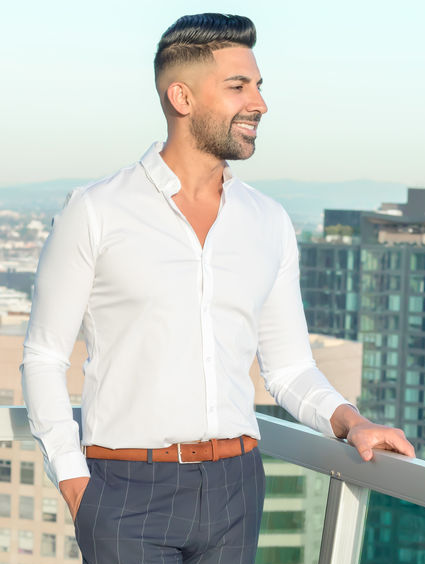
- Mann in 2018
- Born: May 29, 1984 (age 42); United States
- Education: University of California, Davis
- Occupations: Entrepreneur; film producer
- Partner: Laura Avila (eng. 2019)
- Children: 3
- Website: dharmann.com

Dharminder "Dhar" Mann (born May 29, 1984) is an American entrepreneur and film producer. He is the founder of Dhar Mann Studios, a video production company that creates short scripted videos primarily distributed on platforms such as YouTube. The content is aimed at a young audience and often includes narratives with moral lessons.

Mann founded Dhar Mann Studios in 2018 and began publishing videos on YouTube that year; his output consisted of motivational videos, but later shifted focus to morality plays. The studio's YouTube videos had more than a total of 11 billion views by 2023 and two years later employed about 200 staff members at its facility in Burbank, California. In 2026, it signed agreements to produce original video programming for Samsung TV Plus, Fox Entertainment, and The Walt Disney Company.

From 2010 to 2012, Mann and stockbroker Derek Peterson ran the company weGrow, which sold hydroponics marketed for growing medical marijuana. In 2013, Mann was convicted of defrauding the city of Oakland, California, through his real estate company. The conviction was later expunged.

== Early life ==
Dhar Mann was born on May 29, 1984, to Surinder Mann and Baljit Singh Mann, who emigrated from India to the United States. The Singh family owns Friendly Cab, a taxi cab operator based in Oakland, California. They have owned several local real estate companies since 1980, and more than 130 properties.

Mann recalls growing up in a one-bedroom Bay Area apartment which was shared with three other families. As his parents were focused on managing their company, he has said that rather than "give me their time, they gave me money to do things".

== Early career and legal issues ==
At the age of nineteen, Mann started a real estate company and founded other, often failed, companies within the decade including ventures in luxury car rental services and mortgage refinancing.

Mann founded weGrow, a retailer of cannabis-growing hydroponics, with former stock broker Derek Peterson in January 2010. Mann and Peterson rented a supply store in Oakland to sell hydroponics equipment, and aimed to open franchises in eight other states. In early 2011, the weGrow store was closed and Peterson filed lawsuits against the company, citing unpaid debts. He accused Mann of running a "hydroponzi scheme" in a Mother Jones interview. A spokesman for Mann said that Peterson fabricated the allegations in retaliation for Mann's decision to downsize their partnership; Mann successfully countersued Peterson for a cash settlement and stocks in Peterson's own company.

In 2012, Mann was charged with thirteen felony counts of fraud for allegedly defrauding a city beautification program while operating his real estate company MannEdge Properties in 2008 and 2009. Prosecutors reduced the charges to five felony counts in August 2013, and later that year Mann pled no contest to the five counts. He was sentenced to five years of probation and ordered to pay a $10,000 fine and restitution. Mann told The New York Times in 2021 that the conviction was later expunged.

== Dhar Mann Studios ==
Dhar Mann Studios

YouTube information
- Channel: Dhar Mann Studios
- Years active: 2018–present
- Genre: Morality plays
- Subscribers: 27.6 million
- Views: 20.4 billion
- Last updated: 16 September 2026

In 2018, Mann founded Dhar Mann Studios, a video production company that produces films for social media platforms such as YouTube. When he began publishing videos on YouTube in 2018, his output consisted of motivational videos and later shifted focus to morality plays.

In 2021, Mann started a contract with the Creative Artists Agency and launched a mobile app where users can watch videos produced by his studio. In 2024, Mann signed with production company Studio71.

By 2025, the studio was based in a 125,000-square-foot production facility in Burbank, California, which employed approximately 200 staff members, and collaborated with around 2,000 actors annually. The studio operated on a 30-day production schedule and had eight crews filming simultaneously. It also began partnerships with the following companies to produce original video programming: Samsung TV Plus for a dedicated free ad-supported streaming television channel (2025); Fox Entertainment for broadcast on the Holywater platform, with subsequent international distribution by Fox (2026); and The Walt Disney Company (2026).

=== Videos ===
The studio's videos feature often recurring actors. A New York Times profile of Mann described his YouTube videos as "timely narratives about police-calling Karens and COVID-19 hoarders" told in the fashion of "1980s after-school specials and the educational short films of the '50s". It noted their often "thin and absolutist" moral philosophy and "openly click bait" titles. Vulture called them "feel-good" videos intended to "encourage people to be decent to one another."

In 2023, the studio announced Jay & Mikey, a comedy kids show based on the titular characters from Mann's previous short film series with Shaun Dixon and Kaido Lee Roberts reprising their roles as the titular middle-schoolers. By mid-2023, the studio's YouTube videos had more than a total of 11 billion views.

=== Actors' protest ===
In February 2023, multiple actors employed by Dhar Mann Studios said on social media that they have poor working conditions and unsustainable pay. After the protests, Mann issued a statement on his YouTube channel and Instagram account disputing the claims of the protesting actors and accusing them of "spreading false information" about his studio, family, and himself. He explained how the studio operated and disclosed hourly rates for actors.

== Other activities ==
In 2022, Mann announced a new podcast, Dhar & Jay Show, hosted with podcaster Jay Shetty with guests including Charli D'Amelio and Winnie Harlow.

In 2026, Mann was named the NFL's "Chief Kindness Officer," as well as its "Creator of the Week" leading up to Super Bowl LX. Later that year Mann launched the podcast What Happens Next, which features interviews with public figures about defining moments in their lives.

== Personal life ==
In 2014, Mann was engaged to businesswoman Lilly Ghalichi, a participant on the reality television series Shahs of Sunset; they separated later that year. Mann's partner is Laura Avila. Together the couple managed LiveGlam, a cosmetics company which Mann established in 2015.

In late 2020, Mann purchased a mansion in Calabasas, California, previously owned by media personality Khloé Kardashian. Along with his family's real estate activities in Oakland, Mann and his brother Harmit own property across the city.

== Awards and nominations ==
Year	Award	Category	Result	Ref.
2022	Shorty Awards	Audience Honor - YouTube Presence	Won	
2022	Streamy Awards	Scripted Series	Nominated	
2024	Kids' Choice Awards	Favorite Male Creator	Nominated	
2024	Telly Awards	General - Social Video (People's Telly)	Won	
2025	Kids' Choice Awards	Favorite Male Creator	Nominated	
2025	Telly Awards	Family & Parenting	Won	
2025	Telly Awards	Motivational & Advice	Won	
2025	Shorty Award	Best YouTube Presence	Won	
2026	Webby Awards	Best Narrative, Storytelling or Writing	Won	
2026	Telly Awards	General-Social Video	Won	
