= Callum Kerr =

Scottish actor (born 1994)

- Kerr at GalaxyCon Des Moines in 2026
- Born: Andrew Callum Kerr; 11 May 1994 (age 32); Musselburgh, East Lothian, Scotland
- Years active: 2017–present
- Spouse: Lauren Stacy (m. 2026)
- Children: 1
- Mother: Dawn Kerr
- Musical career
- Genre: Country
- Instruments: Vocals; guitar
- Label: Kilted Clan

Andrew Callum Kerr (born 11 May 1994) is a Scottish actor, model, and musician. He gained prominence through his role as PC George Kiss in the Channel 4 soap opera Hollyoaks (2020–2021). After a recurring role in the Fox series Monarch (2022), he went into country music. He has since appeared in the Amazon Prime series The Wheel of Time (2025) and the Netflix series One Piece (2026).

== Early life ==
Kerr grew up in Musselburgh, near Edinburgh.

Kerr joined the National Youth Theatre of Scotland while in school, and auditioned for Skins when he was 15. Kerr played rugby for six months with the National Youth League, and began studying finance at university and working at a law firm. Deciding it was not for him, he withdrew and moved to London to pursue acting. He trained in theatre.

== Career ==
Kerr began modelling in 2017, landing gigs with Jaguar, Adidas, Qatar Airways, Specsavers, and HisColumn. Also in 2017, Kerr appeared in the music video for "Mixed Signals" by Robbie Williams, and made guest appearances in the BBC One series Doctors and Armchair Detectives. In 2019, he played Duncan in the Hulu television adaptation of the romantic comedy film Four Weddings and a Funeral. That same year, he appeared in the docuseries Banged Up Abroad and the ITV sitcom Zomboat!.

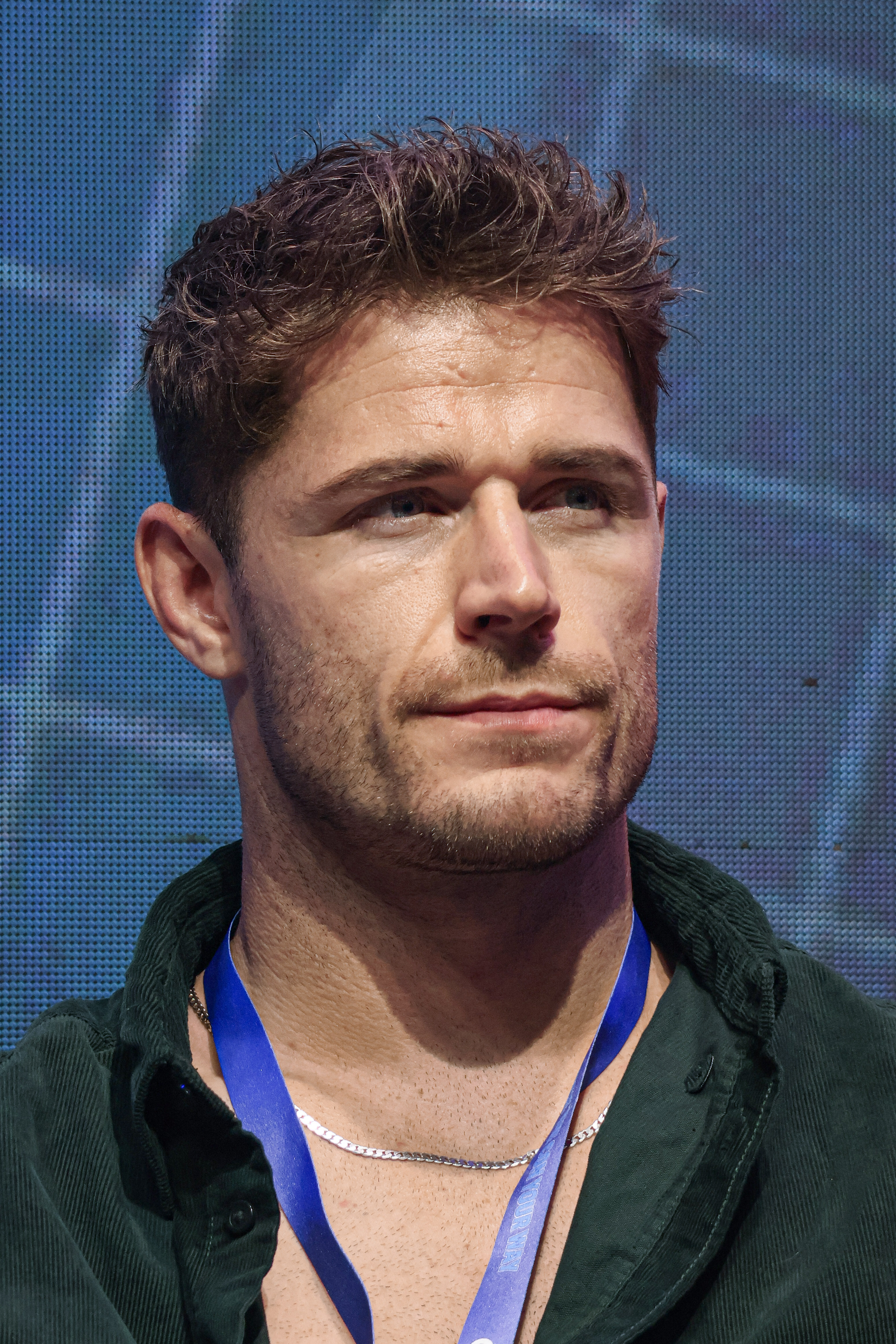
Kerr at Comic Con Cape Town in 2026

In January 2020, Kerr was cast as PC George Kiss in the Channel 4 soap opera Hollyoaks, debuting when long-term character Nancy Osbourne (Jessica Fox) was attacked. Kerr exited the series in April 2021 when his character was killed off.

In 2022, Kerr played Christopher Foxworth in Flowers in the Attic: The Origin, a Lifetime miniseries prequel based on the novel Garden of Shadows, and Wade Stellings, a recurring role in the musical drama Monarch on Fox. He was also cast in the pilot of a Hulu adaptation of Richard Mason's History of a Pleasure Seeker alongside Carla Woodcock, but it was not picked up for series.

After performing on the Nashville country music scene for six months, Kerr released his debut single "Tequila Therapy" in 2023.

Kerr portrays Smoker in the second season of the Netflix series One Piece, the live-action adaptation of the manga series of the same name, and portrays Galad Trakand in the third (and final) season of the Amazon Prime fantasy series The Wheel of Time.

== Personal life ==
From 2021 to 2022, Kerr was briefly engaged to Olivia Anderson, whom he had met in 2016. In July 2023, Kerr announced he was expecting a child with his new partner Lauren Stacy. Their daughter was born in December 2023. Kerr and Stacy married at Carlowrie Castle in January 2026, having become engaged in Cape Town.

In February 2025, Kerr's mother, Dawn Searle, was found dead murdered by her husband, Andrew, who took his own life afterwards at their home in France at Les Pesquiés in the outskirts of Villefranche de Rouergue, Aveyron.

== Filmography ==
=== Film ===
Year	Title	Role	Notes
2017	Him & Her	Him	Short film
2017	2019	Memories	John
2020	Ghetto Bird	Billy	Short film

=== Television ===
Year	Title	Role	Notes
2017	Doctors	Pete Tracker	Episode: "The Mole"
2017	Armchair Detectives	Dale Coleman	Episode: "The Jury's Out"
2018	The Shore	Adam	TV series
2019	Queens of Mystery	Nathan	Episode: "Smoke & Mirrors: First Chapter"
2019	Four Weddings and a Funeral	Duncan	2 episodes
2019	Zomboat!	Jude	5 episodes
2020	Locked Up Abroad	Ryan	Docuseries; episode: "Colombian Double Cross"
2020–2021	Hollyoaks	George Kiss	70 episodes
2021	Glow & Darkness	Frederick VI of Swabia	9 episodes
2022	Flowers in the Attic: The Origin	Christopher Foxworth	Miniseries; 2 episodes
2022	Monarch	Wade Stellings	7 episodes
2022	History of a Pleasure Seeker	Piet Barol	Episode: "Pilot"
2024	Virgin River	Young Everett	3 episodes
2025	The Wheel of Time	Galad Trakand	Season 3
2026	One Piece	Smoker	Season 2

=== Music videos ===
Song	Year	Artist	Notes
"Mixed Signals"	2017	Robbie Williams	

== Discography ==
=== Extended plays ===
Title	Details
Roots Under Me	Released: 25 July 2025; Label: ONErpm; Formats: Digital download, streaming

=== Singles ===
Title	Year	Album or EP
"Tequila Therapy"	2023	Non-album singles
"More Tennessee"	2023	Non-album singles
"Me & Who?"	2023	Non-album singles
"Gone Again"	2023	Non-album singles
"Tamed by Tennessee" (with Chris Andreucci)	2023	Non-album singles
"Cold Beer Cold"	2025	Roots Under Me
"All Out of Me"	2025	Roots Under Me
"Whatever Gets You There"	2025	Roots Under Me

=== Other appearances ===
Title	Year	Album or EP
"Ain't No Sunshine"	2022	Monarch (Original Soundtrack) [Season 1, Episode 2]
"Need You Now" (with Anna Friel)	2022	Monarch (Original Soundtrack) [Season 1, Episode 5]
"I Love a Rainy Night" (with Anna Friel)	2022	Monarch (Original Soundtrack) [Season 1, Episode 7]
"This Heart of Mine"	2024	Mel & Jack's Wedding Mixtape (From the Netflix Series "Virgin River")
