= Shirley Chen =

American actress

- Education: Harvard University (AB)
- Occupation: Actress
- Years active: 2016–present
- Known for: Beast Beast; Dìdi; Slanted;The Body

Shirley Chen is an American actress. She is known for her role as Maddie Delaney in The Body (2026). She also lead the Sundance feature film Beast Beast (2020) and had an ensemble role in Dìdi (2024), for which the cast received the Special Jury Award for Ensemble at the Sundance Film Festival. She starred in the satirical drama Slanted (2025), which won the Narrative Feature Competition Grand Jury Prize at the South by Southwest Film & TV Festival.

== Personal life ==
Chen was born in Pennsylvania, and moved to Washington at a young age, where she grew up. At age 13, she relocated with her family to Los Angeles to pursue an acting career. She attended the Los Angeles County High School for the Arts. Chen graduated from Harvard University in 2022, where she double-majored in History & Literature and Theater, Dance & Media. She was among the first six women cast in the Hasty Pudding Theatricals, the nearly 200-year-old theatrical group. Her senior thesis took the form of a one-woman show, Chinatown, My Chinatown, about the history of beauty pageants in San Francisco 's Chinatown.

== Career ==
At Los Angeles County High School for the Arts, Chen cast in the short film Krista, directed by Danny Madden. Her performance in Krista won the Best Acting in a Narrative Short award at the 2018 South by Southwest Film Festival. Madden subsequently developed Krista into the feature film Beast Beast, executive produced by Alec Baldwin, in which Chen reprised her role as Krista. The film had its world premiere at the 2020 Sundance Film Festival on January 25, 2020. IndieWire called Chen "wildly promising" in its review of the film and wrote that she was "extraordinary" in the film's third act.

In 2021, Chen appeared in and produced the short film Only the Moon Stands Still, executive produced by Lena Waithe, which premiered at the Tribeca Film Festival. In 2022, she performed in a leading role in Man of God at the Geffen Playhouse. Also in 2023, she appeared opposite Awkwafina and Sandra Oh in the Hulu comedy film Quiz Lady.

In 2024, Chen played Vivian Wang in Sean Wang's coming-of-age drama Dìdi, appearing alongside Izaac Wang, Joan Chen, and Chang Li Hua. The cast received the U.S. Dramatic Special Jury Award for Ensemble at the 2024 Sundance Film Festival, and the film also won the Audience Award in the U.S. Dramatic Competition.

Chen led the cast of Amy Wang's satirical drama Slanted (2025), playing a Chinese American high schooler who undergoes an experimental surgery to alter her ethnicity. The film won the Narrative Feature Competition Grand Jury Prize at the 2025 SXSW Film & TV Festival. Bleecker Street and Fox Entertainment Studios subsequently acquired the film for a planned 2026 theatrical release.

In 2025, the Ouray International Film Festival presented Chen with its Excellence in Acting Award, only the second actor to receive the honor.

As of 2026, Chen stars as Maddie Delaney in the series The Body.

== Recognition ==
Chen received the Best Acting in a Narrative Short award at the 2018 South by Southwest Film Festival for Krista. In 2024, she was part of the Dìdi ensemble cast that received the U.S. Dramatic Special Jury Award for Ensemble at the Sundance Film Festival. The Ouray International Film Festival presented her with its Excellence in Acting Award in 2025.
