= Fox Sports 2 =

- Country: United States
- Broadcast area: Nationwide
- Network: Fox Sports
- Headquarters: Fox Network Center (Fox Studio Lot Building 101), 10201 W Pico Blvd, Century City, Los Angeles, California

Programming
- Language: English
- Picture format: 720p (HDTV)

Ownership
- Owner: Fox Sports Media Group (Fox Corporation)
- Sister channels: Fox Sports 1 Fox Soccer Plus; Fox Deportes; Big Ten Network

History
- Launched: July 1, 2003; 23 years ago
- Former names: Fuel TV (2003–2013)

Links
- Website: www.foxsports.com/live/fs2 www.foxsports.com

Availability

Streaming media
- Fox One: fox.com: (American cable internet subscribers only; requires subscription, trial, or television provider login to access content)
- Fox Sports app: Watch live (U.S. only)
- Service(s): DirecTV Stream, Fox One, FuboTV, Hulu + Live TV, Sling TV, YouTube TV

Fox Sports 2 (branded on-air as FS2) is an American sports-oriented pay television channel owned by the Fox Sports Media Group, a unit of Fox Corporation. The channel is based at the Fox Sports division's headquarters on the Fox Studio Lot in the Century City section of Los Angeles, California.

The network was founded as Fuel TV on July 1, 2003, focusing on the culture of extreme sports, including skateboarding, snowboarding, wakeboarding, motocross, surfing, BMX and FMX. The network's prominence expanded further with the introduction of UFC mixed martial arts programming to its lineup in 2012 as part of Speed Channel with Fox Sports. On August 17, 2013, Fuel TV was rebranded as Fox Sports 2, refocusing primarily as an overflow channel for the newly launched mainstream sports network Fox Sports 1. The relaunch of Fuel TV as FS1's sister network received little advanced promotion.

As of September 2018, approximately 57.5 million households (62.3 percent of households with cable TV) received Fox Sports 2. By June 2023, this number dropped to 52.6 million households.

== History ==
=== As Fuel TV ===
Original logo, used from July 1, 2003 to August 17, 2012

The network's concept originated in several extreme sports programming concepts. One of them originated from Alistair Gosling, founder of the Extreme Sports Channel and Extreme Sports TV distribution and production company Extreme. The concept, taken by Gosling to David Sternberg of Fox Sports Net, focused on expanding the coverage of extreme sports. This was translated into growing the existing programming block on the regional sports networks Fox Sports Net airing in the early evenings during the early 2000s on the network's affiliates, which included Blue Torch TV and EX TV, and combining it with brokered arrangements for individual shows which included among others New Waves Surf Television and 16MM, along with ideas from the Europe-based Extreme Sports Chanternberg, CJ Olivares and Lloyd Bryan Adams.

Originally, the name FUEL TV was conceived and launched as a regional weekly TV show that was also focused on extreme sports and indie music by Chris Braly, founder and president of BIG Studios production company. That series debuted on broadcast television on September 8, 2001, on WB affiliate WFLI-TV (channel 53, now a CW affiliate) in Chattanooga, Tennessee, airing on Saturday evenings at midnight. After nearly 100 episodes, News Corporation and CJ Oliveras took notice and eventually negotiated a buyout of the concept and trademark from Braly in late 2003. This weekly episodic version of Fuel TV aired its final episode in September of that year just as FOX was launching their Fuel TV cable and satellite network.

The Fuel TV cable and satellite channel featured programs ranging from original series, exclusive events, licensed films and creative interstitials. Extreme sports programming was formerly the bulk of the network, with a diverse combination of sports, music, reality programming, extreme sports news and other content, including comedic programs.

Fuel TV's second logo, used from 2012 to closure

Beginning in late 2011, Fuel became the official cable home of the Ultimate Fighting Championship as part of a broader agreement between Fox and the mixed martial arts promotion, featuring pre-match and analysis programming involving the circuit such as the weekly UFC Tonight, along with undercard fights for UFC pay-per-view events. By the second half of 2012, Fuel TV's lineup consisted solely of combat sports (such as MMA and boxing) and reruns of reality programs from sister channel Speed.

With the 2012–13 Premier League season, extra live and recorded Premier League matches were carried on Fuel TV, giving Fox Soccer three channels to carry live matches on Premier League match days; this began in May 2012 with Fuel carrying one of nine games on the final day of the Premier League season as part of Fox Sports's "Survival Sunday" effort to air all that day's Premier League matches across the division's cable properties. In March 2013, Fuel TV began airing coverage of the Rugby Football League (RFL) Super League and Championship.

=== Relaunch as Fox Sports 2 ===
Fox Sports 2's first logo, used from 2013 to 2015

In January 2013, alongside reports that Speed was to be replaced by a national sports network known as Fox Sports 1 (which was officially announced by Fox on March 5, 2013, for an August 17 launch), it was reported that Fox was planning to rebrand Fuel TV as Fox Sports 2, a name which Fox had filed a trademark application for on November 27, 2012.

As opposed to the widely publicized launch of Fox Sports 1, the impending replacement of Fuel TV with Fox Sports 2 was met with relatively little fanfare, and was only announced roughly one week prior. The relaunch of the channel as Fox Sports 2 took place on August 17, 2013, at the same time that Speed was replaced by Fox Sports 1. Upon the relaunch, the channel was expanded into a mainstream sports service with a wider variety of content, although combat sports (such as UFC programs) remained an integral part of the lineup. Fuel's signature UFC program, UFC Tonight, moved over to Fox Sports 1 with the launch.

The network's two highest-rated telecasts came from UFC events temporarily airing on FS2 due to overruns on FS1. The first bout of the UFC 200 preliminary card (moved due to baseball overruns on FS1) drew an average of 582,000 viewers, a network high. The first main card bout of UFC Fight Night: Swanson vs. Lobov also aired on FS2 in April 2017, drawing an average of 430,000 viewers. After the move of the rights for the UFC to ESPN and ESPN+ in 2019, its schedule has become more varied, and is less tied to a certain sport than in the past.

== Programming ==
FS2 features reruns of some of the news and analysis programs broadcast by FS1. Sports programming post-UFC includes overflow coverage of events aired by FS1, such as Big East basketball, Mountain West football and basketball, and NASCAR, along with second-tier programming that formerly would have aired as part of the Fox Sports Networks schedule. FS2 also shows select ARCA Menards Series races live. Limited coverage of the Australian Football League moved to FS2 from Fox Soccer Plus (simulcast from Australia via the Seven Network along with full coverage of the State of Origin series live from Australia's Nine Network. This move has proven popular with fans in the United States due to the growing fanbase for Australian rules football in the country. According to the websites of the Australian Football Association of North America and Fox Soccer Plus, Fox Sports has extended its current deal until 2016. FS2 televised some regular-season games and finals matches, while most of the 2015 season was aired on Fox Soccer Plus.

As of 2019, UFC-related programming no longer airs on the channel due to UFC's new deal with ESPN which started that same year. The New York Racing Association provides a substantial portion of FS2's daytime programming, carrying live racing from its tracks under the banner America's Day at the Races, with select races airing on FS1 and the NYRA-sanctioned Belmont Stakes airing on Fox.

In May 2018, it was reported that due to viewer backlash surrounding a preemption of part of a Washington/Stanford football game from FS1 to FS2 due to a NASCAR Camping World Truck Series race, that Fox would now prefer using Fox Business Network (which has distribution more in line with FS1, and only carries non-critical paid programming on weekends) for Pac-12 overflow in the future.

In 2020, FS2 started broadcasting weekly Major League Rugby matches as well as reruns of the 1989 roller derby program RollerGames.

== See also ==
- Fox Sports 1
- Fuel TV (Australia)
- Fuel TV (Portugal)
