= Slanted =

2025 film by Amy Wang

- Theatrical release poster
- Directed by: Amy Wang
- Written by: Amy Wang
- Produced by: Trevor Wall; Adel "Future" Nur; Cameron Boling; Amy Wang; Mark Ankner
- Starring: Shirley Chen; Mckenna Grace; Vivian Wu; Fang Du; Maitreyi Ramakrishnan; Amelie Zilber
- Cinematography: Ed Wu
- Edited by: Ryan Chan
- Music by: Shirley Song
- Production companies: Tideline Entertainment; Mountain Top Pictures
- Distributed by: Bleecker Street; Fox Entertainment Studios
- Release dates: March 8, 2025 (SXSW); March 13, 2026 (United States)
- Running time: 104 minutes
- Country: United States
- Languages: English; Mandarin
- Box office: $906,246

Slanted is a 2025 American body horror–comedy film written and directed by Amy Wang. The film stars Shirley Chen as Chinese-American teenager Joan Huang who undergoes an experimental ethnic modification surgery to try and fit in at school, with Mckenna Grace playing her new identity Jo Hunt. Vivian Wu, Fang Du, Maitreyi Ramakrishnan, and Amelie Zilber provide supporting roles. Wang, Mark Ankner, Trevor Wall and Adel "Future" Nur produced the film through the companies Tideline Entertainment and Mountain Top Pictures.

The film premiered at the South by Southwest Film & TV Festival on March 8, 2025, as part of the Narrative Feature Competition. It was released in the United States on March 13, 2026, by Bleecker Street and Fox Entertainment Studios.

== Plot ==
Chinese-American high schooler Joan Huang struggles to connect with her white peers, leaving her feeling ashamed of her appearance. Having dreamed of becoming prom queen since she was a child, she sees an opportunity when the most popular girl at school, Olivia Hammond, reveals she will not be running for prom queen this year. Hoping to get Olivia's endorsement, Joan dyes her hair blonde and gets Olivia a discounted mani-pedi at a Chinese nail salon, though both efforts fail.

Meanwhile, Joan receives messages from the creators of an ethnicity-changing online filter, Ethnos, who offer her a "once-in-a-lifetime" opportunity. She eventually reaches out and learns that Ethnos is a clinic that specializes in ethnic modification surgery; its founder, Dr. Willie Singer, is an Indian-American doctor who grew tired of being passed over for opportunities compared to his white peers and has co-created a groundbreaking plastic surgery that can make clients look white, which he has used on himself and all of his employees. Desperate for camaraderie, Joan gets her mother Sofia to sign the consent form for the surgery by telling her it is for a school field trip.

Now visibly presenting as a white girl, Joan immediately sees a change in how she is treated in public and by her peers. Her parents Sofia and Roger, are horrified and try to get the surgery reversed, but Dr. Singer asserts that the procedure is permanent and that Joan will benefit in the long run. Joan returns to school under the alias "Jo Hunt" and quickly befriends Olivia. Jo hosts a party at the house of her dad's cleaning client Harmony, while she is away. While there, Olivia offers to give Jo her endorsement for prom queen if she proves she can be trusted. Joan's Indian-American friend Brindha figures out Jo's identity and comforts her over her struggles and decision to undergo the surgery. Shortly thereafter, Olivia publicly presses Jo to oust Brindha and her other non-white friends from the party. Jo reluctantly orders them to leave, gaining Olivia's endorsement but damaging her friendship with Brindha, who questions if Joan applies her disdain for her own ethnic features to all other non-white people. Additionally, Joan finds herself becoming increasingly emotionally disconnected from her parents.

Jo begins to notice deformations forming in her face, which she peels off to discover her original skin tone underneath. The Ethnos clinic claims this is normal and can be treated with tape and a rejuvenation cream. At the prom, Jo's face starts to deform again. When she runs to the bathroom to try to fix it, Olivia helps her, stating that her old face will fight back at first. Jo is elected prom queen but her face begins to melt onstage, to the horror and disgust of her classmates. She collapses and awakens in Olivia's home, where she learns that Olivia and her father Hank are actually Cuban American and have not spoken with Olivia's mother in years after she refused to undergo the surgery.

Realizing the vapid lives the Hammonds live and the cultural history and family connection she has lost by becoming white, Joan returns home and reconciles with her parents. They sympathize with her feeling ostracized for looking different, but Roger states that her goal should be to form her own American identity rather than assimilating with everyone else. When Joan and Sofia return to the clinic to try to get the surgery reversed, they find it overcrowded with non-white people lining up for the surgery. Dr. Singer reaffirms that the procedure is permanent and insists that Joan's original identity had to be lost. At home, a desperate Joan violently tears off her new face. Discovering her original East Asian eyes underneath, she stares at them in the mirror and tears up as she seemingly begins to appreciate them for the first time.

== Cast ==
- Shirley Chen as Joan Huang
  - Mckenna Grace as Jo Hunt
  - Kristen Cui as young Joan Huang
- Vivian Wu as Sofia Huang
- Fang Du as Roger Huang
- Maitreyi Ramakrishnan as Brindha
- Amelie Zilber as Olivia Hammond
- R. Keith Harris as Dr. Willie Singer
- Elaine Hendrix as Harmony
- Jonathan D. Williams as Hank Hammond

== Production ==
In May 2024, Fox Entertainment green-lit production of Slanted through its subsidiary production company Tideline Entertainment; Mountain Top Pictures also signed on to produce the film. Shirley Chen and Mckenna Grace were cast as the lead role, and Maitreyi Ramakrishnan and Amelie Zilber were cast for significant supporting roles.

Principal photography took place from June 24 to July 22, 2024, in Atlanta.

== Release ==
Slanted premiered at the South by Southwest Film & TV Festival on March 8, 2025, as part of the Narrative Feature Category. In September, Bleecker Street and Fox Entertainment Studios acquired distribution rights, aiming for a 2026 theatrical release. In October 2025, Bleecker Street announced the launch of a division named Crosswalk, focusing on event cinema releases and partnership distribution, with Slanted named among its first releases. It was released in select theaters in the United States on March 13, 2026.

== Reception ==
On the review aggregator website Rotten Tomatoes, 68% of 72 critics' reviews are positive. The website's consensus reads: "Slanted blends genre thrills and pointed commentary on racial identity into a daring body horror parable, even if its occasionally unfocused script keeps writer-director Amy Wang's provocative vision from fully landing." Metacritic, which uses a weighted average, assigned the film a score of 55 out of 100, based on eight critics, indicating "mixed or average" reviews.

== See also ==
- American Born Chinese
