= Paul Cheesbrough =

British media executive

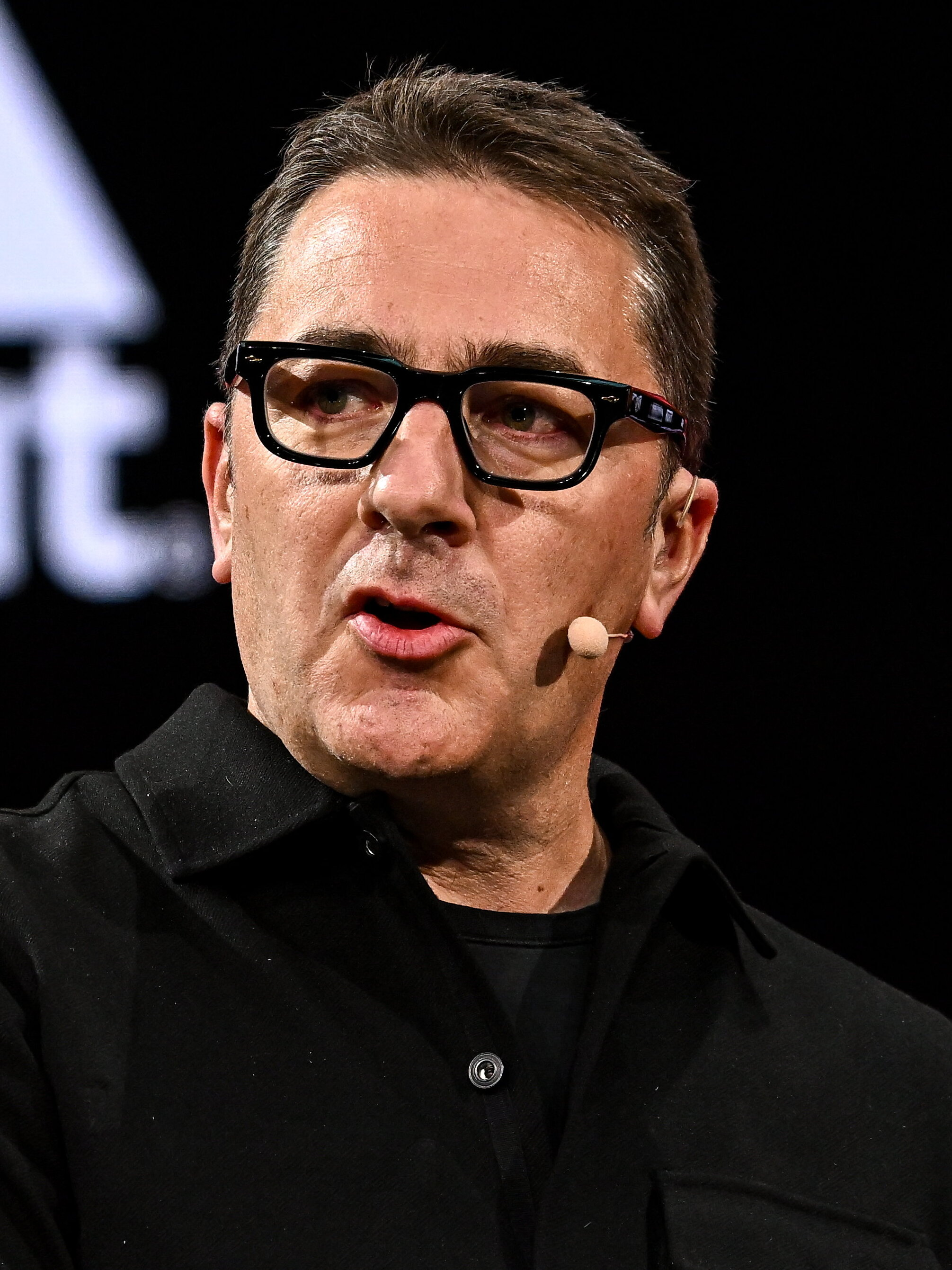
Cheesbrough in 2024

Paul Cheesbrough is a British Media Executive and is the current CEO of Tubi Media Group.

== Education ==
Cheesbrough received his Bachelor's degree in Strategic Systems Management at Bournemouth University in 1996 and his MBA from the University of Bradford School of Management in 2006.

== Career ==
On 31 October 2016, it was announced that Cheesbrough would be joining 21st Century Fox as Chief Technology Officer from 1 December 2016, remaining in New York.

Prior to joining News Corp, he was Chief Information Officer of News International, the UK subsidiary of News Corporation.

Cheesbrough started his career at IBM before moving to the BBC's commercial operation, BBC Worldwide. He then spent four years at the BBC as Digital Media Controller. He is widely credited for the driving corporation's digital education portfolio and the transition to digital.

In 2007, Cheesbrough joined the British newspaper, The Daily Telegraph as Chief Information Officer. He remained in that role for three years transforming the company's digital portfolio before joining News International in 2010.

In 2023, he Chief Technology Officer of Fox Corporation, he was responsible for all the Technology in the company and also focused on the separation of News Corporation into two separate businesses in 2013 and works for Robert Thomson after initially working directly for Murdoch.
