= Beast Beast =

2020 American coming-of-age film

- Promotional release poster
- Directed by: Danny Madden
- Written by: Danny Madden
- Produced by: Matt Miller; Jim Cummings; Tara Ansley; Benjamin Wiessner; William Pisciotta; Eli Raskin
- Starring: Shirley Chen; Will Madden; Jose Angeles
- Cinematography: Kristian Zuniga
- Edited by: David Brundige; Pete Ohs; Mari Walker
- Production companies: Vanishing Angle; Arsonist's Films; Persona Entertainment
- Release date: January 25, 2020 (Sundance)
- Running time: 85 minutes
- Country: United States
- Language: English

Beast Beast is a 2020 American coming-of-age drama film written and directed by Danny Madden. Based on a 2018 short film titled Krista, also directed by Danny Madden, the film stars Shirley Chen, Will Madden, and Jose Angeles as three young adults whose lives intersect in a suburban town.

Beast Beast was executive produced by Alec Baldwin and Casey Bader, and premiered at the 2020 Sundance Film Festival.

== Plot ==
In a suburban town in the Southern United States, a high school student named Krista is a member of her school's theater program. In her childhood, she produced short videos with her next-door neighbor, the recently graduated Adam. Adam has since started a YouTube channel to which he uploads videos of himself providing demonstrations on using various models of firearms that he owns. However, his videos are receiving little attention online, and his father disapproves of his focusing on his YouTube presence rather than finding a job elsewhere.

Nito, a skateboarder, attends the same school as Krista. One day, while idling outside the apartment where he and his apathetic guardian live, Nito meets a fellow tenant named Yoni, who invites Nito to a party that night after seeing him perform a kickflip. At the party, Nito interacts with Krista, who earlier that evening had watched videos of Nito skateboarding online. Later on, police officers arrive to break up the party. In the commotion, a male partygoer tries to grab Krista, and Nito fights him off. Krista escapes but Nito is arrested.

After being released from jail, Nito is picked up in a car by Yoni and Yoni's friends Lena and Jarrett. Yoni, Lena, and Jarrett convince Nito to help them steal items such as Hot Pockets and perfume. During school, Nito and Krista grow closer; he tries to show her how to skateboard, and she teaches him how to imitate being slapped and choked for stage purposes. While working on a performance inspired by a past experience Nito had with a parakeet, he and Krista share a kiss.

In an effort to attract more viewers and subscribers to his YouTube channel, Adam produces a dramatized video of himself detailing an experience he claimed to have had wherein he fended off an attack by a wild warthog using a firearm. When the video receives a number of negative and insulting comments, Adam becomes infuriated and records a video of himself angrily responding to and threatening the commenters.

Lena drives Nito, Yoni, and Jarrett to the house where her boss lives, and demands that they break in and retrieve her vape pen, which her boss confiscated from her. Her boss is Adam's mother, and when Nito, Yoni, and Jarrett enter the house, Adam hears them from his upstairs bedroom. Jarrett begins to ascend the stairs leading up to the house's second floor, and Adam fatally shoots him from the top of the stairs with a rifle. After Adam proceeds to shoot Yoni, Nito attempts to flee, but is shot and killed by Adam after running outside. Krista, walking home from school with a friend, watches Nito die and sees an armed Adam standing in the doorway to the house.

The incident is covered by the news, prompting Adam's YouTube channel to receive a surge of popularity. Online commenters and local police officials refer to Adam as a "hero" for standing his ground against the three intruders. Adam continues to make firearms-based videos that prove successful with his online followers, while Krista becomes an emotional wreck at school over the loss of Nito. When Adam is invited to speak at a conference about firearms, Krista attends and follows him into a restroom to confront him. She forces him to put his hands around her neck and she screams, drawing the attention of police officers in the building. Adam is detained, and the video he made in which he threatens his YouTube commenters is leaked to the public. Meanwhile, Krista returns to her theater classes with a sense of closure.

== Cast ==
- Shirley Chen as Krista
- Will Madden as Adam
- Jose Angeles as Nito
- Courtney Dietz as Johanna
- Devan Katherine as Kate
- Daniel Rashid as Yoni
- Anissa Matlock as Lena
- Stephen Ruffin as Jarrett
- Chip Carriere as Lance
- Kron Moore as Linney
- Susan Gallagher as Mrs. Gunderson
- Charles Green as Mr. Gunderson
- Cynthia Barrett as Mabel

== Release ==
Beast Beast premiered at the 2020 Sundance Film Festival on January 25, 2020.

The film was released on Tubi on February 12, 2021.

== Reception ==
On review aggregator website Rotten Tomatoes, the film has an approval rating of 79% based on 29 reviews, with an average rating of 5.9/10. The site's critical consensus reads, "Featuring an exceptional performance from Shirley Chen, Beast Beast thoughtfully places its young protagonists on center stage in a conflicting coming of age story." On Metacritic, the film has a weighted average score of 63 out of 100 based on five critic reviews, indicating "generally favorable" reviews.

Beandrea July of The Hollywood Reporter commended the film's lead performances, screenplay, cinematography, and sound editing, and wrote that, by the film's third act, "you realize what the movie is ultimately aiming to be: a cautionary tale about guns in America." Variety's Amy Nicholson praised Angeles's performance and noted the film's humor, though she wrote that the film's third act "accelerates from reality to sensationalism, and trades humanity for pulp. Even in the noir climax, Beast Beast's ideas about validation and integrity are worth a grapple. If only the film's own self-identity was more grounded." Monica Castillo of RogerEbert.com wrote that the film "will either win you over with Shirley Chen's effervescent screen presence or will doom its goodwill with its third act twist", calling it "a conflicted work, but not without its merits".
