= Chris Andreucci =

Scottish country music singer/songwriter (born 1998)

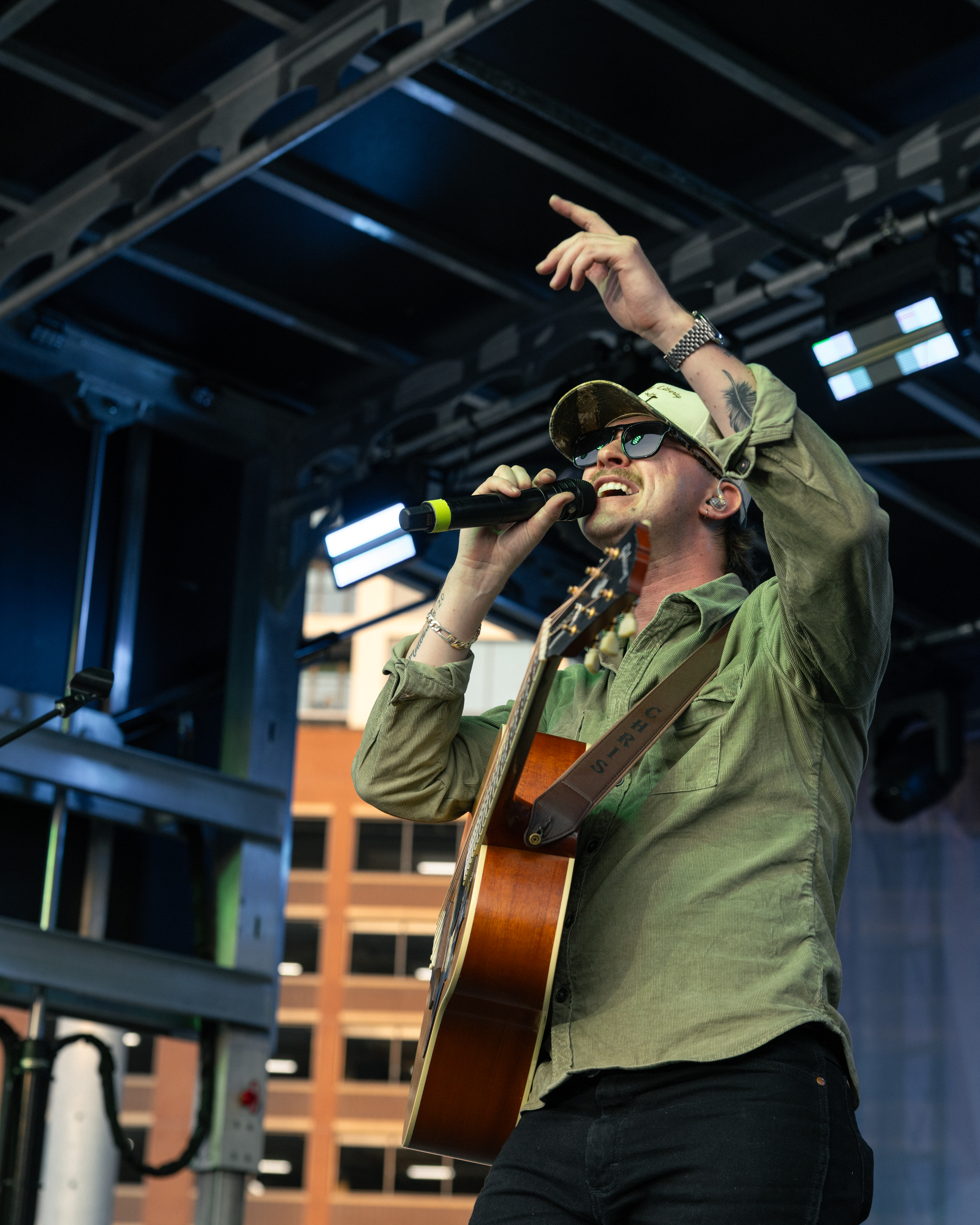
- Andreucci in June 2025

Background information
- Born: Christopher Paul Andreucci; 16 November 1998 (age 27); Ayr, Scotland
- Genre: Country
- Occupation: Singer/songwriter
- Instruments: Vocals, Acoustic Guitar, Piano
- Years active: 2017-present
- Labels: Cypress Management, Century Music Group
- Website: chrisandreucci.com

Christopher Paul Andreucci (born 16 November 1998) is a Scottish country music artist and published songwriter. His current releases include: multi-million streamed "Tamed By Tennessee", "Missing You Again", "Call Her Cowboy", "Killin' Time" which reached #1 on the UK iTunes Charts,.

== Early life ==
Andreucci was born and raised in Ayr, Scotland and has been performing since childhood. While attending Belmont Academy, Andreucci regularly took part in musical activities, including various vocal groups, bands and musical theatre. Later, he attended the University of Strathclyde where he regularly played live around the city of Glasgow. During his degree, Andreucci went on exchange to the University of North Carolina at Greensboro (UNCG) and during this period of time he fell in love with country music.

== Music ==
Andreucci released his first single, "Talk to Me", in June 2018. Later that year, he released his second single, "Nothing in the World". In December 2018, Andreucci released his debut album, The Opener, recorded and produced by Paul McInally. In 2019 during his exchange trip in North Carolina, Andreucci released his first EP, A Traveller's Tale.

Andreucci signed a publishing deal with Century Music Group in May 2019 while playing a writer's round in Nashville. His first label EP, What Don't Kill You, was released in December 2020.

Andreucci headlined at Celtic Connections at the Glasgow Royal Concert Hall to a sell-out crowd. He was also added to the C2C: Country to Country bill at the SSE Hydro in Glasgow alongside Luke Combs, Brett Young, and Tanya Tucker.

On 1 April 2020 Andreucci released a two-song live EP titled Caledonia. The EP includes a cover of Dougie MacLean's "Caledonia", and a live bonus track titled "Town Called Misery".

The above releases have since been removed from all streaming platforms.

December 2020 brought the long-awaited EP "What Don't Kill You", recorded with Century Music Group in Nashville, TN. The six song album was released on the 21st.

After a year of no live music and recording, Andreucci returned to the scene with his third studio single "Killin' Time" on July 16, 2021. Co-written with Conner Edmunds of Bailer Music Publishing and produced by CÄLLEN Sounds, the track adopts a new sound for the Scotsman which was received very well with the new single debuting at #1 on the UK iTunes Charts. Andreucci later signed a new publishing deal with Bailer Music Publishing.

In August 2022 Andreucci released his fourth studio single "Strangers In A Bar", co-written by John Haywood and Carver Partin. "Strangers In A Bar" debuted at #3 on the UK iTunes Charts. This single carved out a new sound for the Scotsman who worked closely with producers Jimmy Mansfield and Paul Rogers of Red Giraffe Recordings Nashville.

In 2023, Andreucci released four singles, the first being "To The Moon & Back". This track was co-written with California native songwriter Kylie Hughes and debuted at #6 on the iTunes country chart. July of '23 brought the release of a new single titled "Written In Rock", a song that the Scotsman wrote for his sister on her wedding day. Following the success of "To The Moon & Back" Andreucci released an acoustic version of this track in August of the same year.

Andreucci closed out 2023 with his biggest release to date, a duet with fellow Scotsman Callum Kerr - Tamed By Tennessee. The song remains both artists' most streamed release accumulating over 5 million global streams in the first six months.

Following on the success of "Tamed By Tennessee", the Scotsman continued to release music throughout 2024. Releases include: "Let Her", "Call Her Cowboy" his second song to break 100,000 streams, "Same Ol Me" and feel good heartbreak song "LONELY" loses out that year.

2025 brought new music and bigger stages for Andreucci. His sophomore EP "ONE NIGHT RODEO" included 6 songs, with "BREAK DOWN" and "THIS BAR" being new releases. The seasoned Scotsman appeared on WKRN News on ABC that same year prior to his Grand Ole Opry 100 Summer Sessions performance.

The momentum has not stopped in 2026, with Andreucci performing at the Music City Rodeo and releasing "Missing You Again". It is speculated he will release more music as the year goes on.

== Capital FM: Country Take Over ==
In May 2020, Andreucci spent a full week as the guest on Capital FM Scotland. Over the week Andreucci was challenged every day by presenter Katy J to perform a live country version of a song requested by listeners. Andreucci performed country covers of "Ladbroke Grove"by AJ Tracey, "Blinding Lights" by The Weeknd, "What a Man Gotta Do" by Jonas Brothers, "Savage" by Megan Thee Stallion, and "Birthday" by Anne-Marie. These appearances soon became known as the Country Take Over.

== Songwriting Career ==
Alongside Andreucci's artist career he has achieved success as a published songwriter. Andreucci has played a key writing role in a number of songs across different genres, these include the following:

Credits

Title	Artist	Songwriters
Hung Up	Artist: Donn Bnnr, C-Ro, Pop Tracker; Label: Sony Music Germany	Benedikt Wellmann, Christopher Dübner, Christopher Paul Andreucci, Martin Richter
This Side of the Dirt	Artist: Bryan Frazier & Marc Oriet; Label: Independent	Christopher Paul Andreucci, Marc Oriet, Bryan Frazier, Cody Parks
More Tennessee	Artist: Callum Kerr; Label: Independent	Christopher Paul Andreucci, Callum Kerr
Me & Who	Artist: Callum Kerr; Label: Independent	Christopher Paul Andreucci, Brock Butler, Callum Kerr
Money Can't Buy	Artist: Kaleb Sanders; Label: Red Street Records	Christopher Paul Andreucci, Carson Beyer, Joe Haydel, Cody Bradley, Brad Wagner
Over The Moon	Artist: Justin Andrews; Label: Independent	Christopher Paul Andreucci, Justin Andrews
Dust & Diesel	Artist: Nathan Merovich; Label: Independent	Christopher Paul Andreucci, Tia Welsh, Nathan Merovich
Worth A Dream	Artist: Bear Redell; Label: Independent	Christopher Paul Andreucci, Sam Varga, Bear Redell
Waiting On The Wind	Artist: Lauren June; Label: Independent	Christopher Paul Andreucci, Callum Kerr, Lauren Thalheimer
In A Honkytonk	Artist: Eli Locke; Label: Independent	Christopher Paul Andreucci, Eli Locke, Ryan Nelson
One For You	Artist: Shellem Cline; Label: Square One Records	Christopher Paul Andreucci, Shellem Cline
Gravel Gospel	Artist: Shellem Cline; Label: Square One Records	Christopher Paul Andreucci, Shellem Cline, Chad Sellers

== Artist Discography ==
Studio Albums

Title	Album details	Studio & Engineer
The Opener	Released: 23 December 2019; Label: Chris Andreucci	45 A-side Recordings; Paul McInally

Extended Plays

Title	Details	Studio & Engineer
A Traveller's Tale	Released: 1 May 2019; Label: Chris Andreucci	45 A-side Recordings; Paul McInally
What Don't Kill You	Released: 21 December 2020; Label: Century Music Group	Soul Train Sound Studios; Justin Cortelyou
ONE NIGHT RODEO	Released: 14 November 2025; Label: Ucci Cucci Music	Saxman Studio; Seth Michael

Singles

Title	Details	Studio & Engineer
Talk To Me	Released: 1 June 2018; Label: Chris Andreucci	45 A-side Recordings; Paul McInally
Nothing In The World	Released: 7 September 2019; Label: Chris Andreucci	45 A-side Recordings; Paul McInally
Killin' Time	Released: 16 July 2021; Label: Bailer Music Publishing	CÄLLEN Sounds; CÄLLEN
Strangers In A Bar	Released: 19 August 2022; Label: Chris Andreucci	Red Giraffe Recordings Nashville; Jimmy Mansfield & Paul Rogers
To The Moon & Back	Released: 16 June 2023; Label: Chris Andreucci	Funk Studios; Michael Funk
Written In Rock	Released: 21 July 2023; Label: Chris Andreucci	Funk Studios; Michael Funk
To The Moon & Back (Acoustic Version)	Released: 25 August 2023; Label: Chris Andreucci	Funk Studios; Michael Funk
Tamed By Tennessee	Released: 15 December 2023; Label: Ucci Cucci Music & Kilted Clan	Sound Stage Studio; Ilya Toshinskiy
Let Her	Released: 21 June 2024; Label: Ucci Cucci Music	Saxman Studio; Seth Michael
Call Her Cowboy	Released: 27 September 2024; Label: Ucci Cucci Music	Saxman Studio; Seth Michael
Same Ol' Me	Released: 8 November 2024; Label: Ucci Cucci Music	Saxman Studio; Seth Michael
LONELY	Released: 28 March 2025; Label: Ucci Cucci Music	Saxman Studio; Seth Michael
DAMN BROKE	Released: 13 JUNE 2025; Label: Ucci Cucci Music	Saxman Studio; Seth Michael
BREAK DOWN	Released: 5 September 2025; Label: Ucci Cucci Music	Saxman Studio; Seth Michael
Missing You Again	Released: 19 June 2026; Label: Ucci Cucci Music	Saxman Studio; Seth Michael

Appears On

Title	Track/s	Details
Acoostic 2018	Someone Else	Released: 28 April 2018; Group/Organisation: BurnsFest
Sounds From Scotland (Vol.1)	Masterplan (Reno) & Most Of Our Time	Released: 30 November 2020; Group/Organisation: American-Scottish Foundation
