= Amelie Zilber =

American actress and internet personality

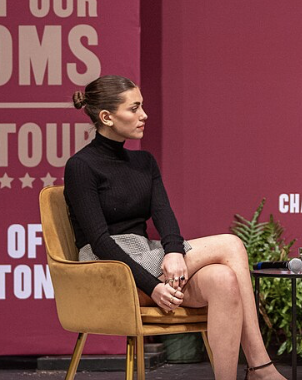
- Zilber during a conversation with Kamala Harris and Justin Jones in 2023
- Born: March 27, 2002 (age 24); Los Angeles, California, U.S.
- Occupations: Influencer, actress, model
- Political party: Democratic

Instagram information
- Page: Amelie
- Followers: 1.90 million

TikTok information
- Page: Amelie Zilber
- Followers: 6.40 million

Amelie Zilber (born March 27, 2002) is an American internet personality, actress, political activist, and model. She played Lauryn in season five of Grown-ish, and has a supporting role in the 2025 body-horror film Slanted.

== Early life and education ==
Zilber was born on March 27, 2002, in Los Angeles, USA to parents Christine and Laurent Zilber. Her mother, the founder of Jouer Cosmetics, is the daughter of Lebanese-American billionaire Marshall Naify. Zilber is of Lebanese descent through her mother, and of French descent through both her mother and father. She graduated from the private high school Harvard-Westlake in 2020. She began her undergraduate studies at Georgetown University before transferring to the Columbia University School of General Studies.

== Career ==
On TikTok, Zilber has over 6 million followers. Her content is a mix of beauty and fashion videos and political activism. She worked with the Biden-Harris campaign in 2020 to encourage young Americans to get out to vote. She also interviewed senior Biden advisor Symone Sanders, former White House press secretary Jen Psaki, and former Transportation secretary Pete Buttigieg for her social media followers.

Zilber made her acting debut in 2022 as Lauryn in season five of the television sitcom Grown-ish.

== Filmography ==
Year	Title	Role	Notes	Ref(s)
2022-2024	Grown-ish	Lauryn		
2025	Emily in Paris	Commercial actress	Episode: "The One Where Emily Goes to the Embassy"	
2025	Slanted	Olivia Hammond		

== Personal life ==
From 2020 to 2023, Zilber was in a relationship with American TikTok personality Blake Gray. In 2025, she was romantically linked to American actor and singer Joshua Bassett.

Zilber is currently based in New York City.
