= Fox Entertainment Studios =

Division of Fox Entertainment (founded 2022)

- Type: Division
- Industry: Film production Television production
- Founded: September 11, 2022; 4 years ago
- Headquarters: Los Angeles, California, US
- Key people: Fernando Szew (head of Fox Entertainment Studios)
- Products: Motion pictures Television programs
- Parent: Fox Entertainment
- Divisions: Fox Alternative Entertainment; Fox Scripted Studios
- Subsidiaries: Bento Box Entertainment; Blockchain Creative Labs; MarVista Entertainment; Studio Ramsay Global; TMZ
- Website: Official website

Fox Entertainment Studios is a division of Fox Entertainment which produces films and television shows in-house, as opposed to contracting studios. It was founded on September 11, 2022.

== History ==
=== Background ===
On March 20, 2019, the Walt Disney Company acquired 20th Century Fox Television, 20th Television and Fox Television Animation as part of its completed acquisition of 21st Century Fox and placed them under the Disney Television Studios division of Walt Disney Television.

On August 10, 2020, 20th Century Fox Television and 20th Television were merged into one unit as part of a restructuring plan by Disney regarding their television production units; the merged company took on the latter's name. ABC Signature was dissolved on October 1, 2024, and had its operations folded into 20th Television, which has since become ABC's flagship production arm.

As part of acquisition of 21st Century Fox by Disney, newly formed Fox Corporation lost almost all 20th Century Fox Television library (except America's Most Wanted, Studs, & A Public Affair).

On August 6, 2019, it was announced that Fox Corporation would acquire Bento Box Entertainment, while still allowing it to operate as an independent production house.

In August 2021, Fox Entertainment entered into an overall deal with Gordon Ramsay to establish Studio Ramsay Global, which absorbed Ramsay's pre-existing business with All3Media and would oversee his future endeavors. September 2021 saw Fox Entertainment's acquisition of TMZ from WarnerMedia for approximately $50 million.

In December 2021, Fox Entertainment acquired television film studio MarVista Entertainment.

=== Launch ===
In September 2022, Fox Corporation launched Fox Entertainment Studios, its inaugural foray into wholly in-house television production, premiering its first show, Monarch, on September 11, 2022.

== Television shows ==
Title	Genre	First air date	Last air date	Number of seasons	Network	Co-production company(s)	Note(s)
Monarch	Family drama	September 11, 2022	December 6, 2022	1	Fox	Sandbox Entertainment, The Jackal Group, Oh That Gus, Inc. and London Calling, Inc.	copyright held under "Monarch XOF, LLC"
Animal Control	Sitcom	February 16, 2023	Present	5	Fox	Roughhouse Productions, Middletown News and Wow a Fox	
Going Dutch	Sitcom	January 2, 2025	April 23, 2026	2	Fox	Red Lion Friday Productions and Amoeba	
Doc	Medical drama	January 7, 2025	Present	3	Fox	Avenue K Productions, Channel Road Productions, Lux Vide, 3 Arts Entertainment and Sony Pictures Television	Based on the Italian TV series Doc – Nelle tue mani
One Day in October	Drama	October 7, 2025		1	HBO Max	Yes TV and Moriah Media	based on real-life accounts from the October 7, 2023, attack on Israel
Best Medicine	Medical comedy-drama	January 4, 2026	Present	2	Fox	All3Media International, Tuccillo, Inc. and Propagate Content	Based on Doc Martin
The Faithful: Women of the Bible	Biblical drama	March 22, 2026	April 5, 2026	1	Fox	Siesta Productions and Carol Mendelsohn Productions	Based on the biblical book of the same name
The Well	Documentary	November 9, 2026		1	Hulu	Mountain Top Pictures, Haven Entertainment and Fairvale Entertainment	
Baywatch	Action	January 6, 2027			Fox	Tower 12 Productions, Flying Glass of Milk Productions, Wonderland Sound and Vision and Fremantle North America	Revival of 1989 series
The Interrogator	Spy drama	2027			Fox	Lionsgate Television	
Highway to Heaven	Fantasy drama	2027 or 2028			Fox	Amblin Television and Michael Landon Productions	Based on the 1984 series of the same name
Almost Paradise	Comedy				Fox	Kapital Entertainment	
Billionaire Apocalypse	Drama				Fox		
The Dogwood	Comedy				ABC		
Earthquake	Comedy				Fox	North Hill Productions and 3 Arts Entertainment	
How Can We Help	Political comedy				Fox	Brillstein Entertainment Partners	
Mammoth	Comedy				Fox	BBC Studios Los Angeles	Based on the British series of the same name
Perf	Comedy				Fox		
Proof	Supernatural crime drama				Fox	Westbrook Studios and Aperture Entertainment	Based on the comic book series of the same name
The Miracle Department	Drama				Fox	Okay Goodnight	
Thunderjacks	Sitcom				Fox		
Untitled Jermaine Fowler comedy	Sitcom				Fox		
Untitled Paul Reiser comedy	Sitcom				Fox		
Untitled Vampire Comedy	Sitcom				Fox	Kapital Entertainment and KatCo	
Wine & Spirits	Drama				Fox	Lady Metalmark and 3 Arts Entertainment	

== Films ==
Title	Year	Director	Distributor	Notes	Ref.
Pastacolypse	2023	Jason Shwartz	Tubi	co-production with Bento Box Entertainment	
Cinnamon	2023	Bryian Keith Montgomery Jr.	Tubi	co-production with Village Roadshow Pictures and Content Cartel Studios	
Murder City	2023	Michael D. Olmos	Tubi	co-production with Village Roadshow Pictures and Content Cartel Studios	
Millennial Hunter	2023	Jason Shwartz	Tubi	co-production with Bento Box Entertainment	
Big Bruh	2023	Jason Shwartz	Tubi	co-production with Bento Box Entertainment	
Slanted	2025	Amy Wang	Bleecker Street	co-production with Mountain Top Pictures and Tideline Entertainment	
