= My Drama =

Video streaming platform

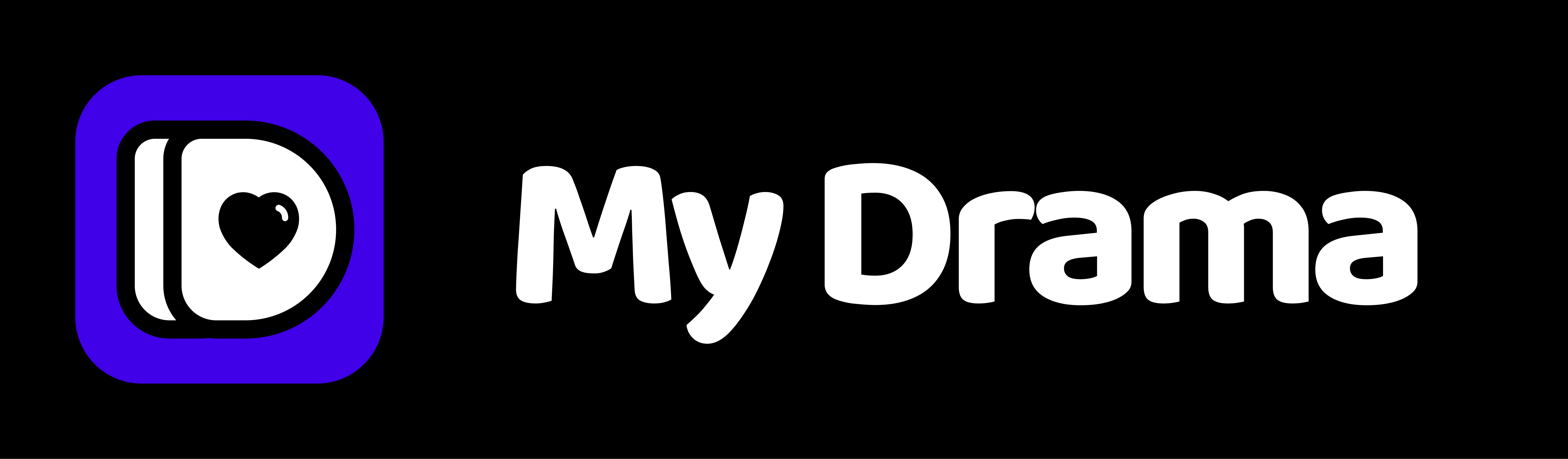
- Type: Streaming service
- Industry: Entertainment, technology
- Founded: March 2024
- Founder: Bogdan Nesvit, Anatolii Kasianov
- Area served: Worldwide (190+ countries)
- Key people: Bogdan Nesvit (Co-founder and Co-CEO); Anatolii Kasianov (Co-founder and Co-CEO)
- Products: Vertical-format streaming series
- Services: Mobile and web-based vertical streaming platform
- Parent: Holywater Tech
- Website: my-drama.com

My Drama (also may be stylised as MyDrama) is a global streaming service specializing in vertical video series for Microdrama. It is owned by the company Holywater Tech. The platform focuses on short-form, emotional storytelling optimized for smartphone viewing, offering content in over 30 languages across 190 countries.

== History ==
My Drama was launched in 2024 by Holywater Tech, founded by Ukrainian entrepreneur Bogdan Nesvit and Anatolii Kasianov. The service gained international traction as part of a growing market for short-form vertical storytelling, influenced by mobile-first entertainment trends.

My Drama primarily streams serialized vertical dramas, which are short-form episodes around 1-2 minutes in length designed for mobile consumption.

Many series are adaptations of successful stories originally published on Holywater Tech's book platform My Passion.

In 2024, My Drama won a People's Voice award at the 28th Annual Webby Awards.

In 2025, My Drama received a Gold Award at the MUSE Creative Awards in the Mobile App: Video Streaming Services category.

In 2025, the company received strategic investment from Fox Entertainment, aimed at expanding content creation capabilities and producing over 200 vertical video series.

In January 2026, Holywater Tech raised $22 million in funding to expand its microdrama business in the United States. The investment round was led by Horizon Capital, with participation from U.S.-based investors including Endeavor Catalyst and Wheelhouse. The funding is intended to support the development of Holywater Tech's mobile-first vertical video platform, My Drama, as well as the company's AI-driven content initiatives, such as AI-assisted comics and anime.

In February 2026, Holywater bought Jeynix, a studio that uses AI for special effects. This deal helps the company make better-quality shows and translate them into different languages much faster.

== Partnerships ==
In 2024, Holywater Tech entered a partnership with Latin American studio Elefantec Global to distribute vertical dramas in Spanish-language markets.

In early 2026, Fox Entertainment entered into a partnership with content creator Dhar Mann to produce a slate of 40 original vertical microdrama series. Under the agreement, the series debut exclusively on the My Drama platform, while global distribution is managed by Fox Entertainment Global.

== Reception ==
My Drama has been highlighted in discussions of the global rise of vertical short drama platforms and has been compared with similar apps such as ReelShort and DramaBox.

== See also ==
- Short-form video
- Vertical video
