= Comic Con Cape Town =

Comic convention held annually in Cape Town

- Status: Active
- Genre: Comic con
- Frequency: Annually
- Locations: CTICC, Cape Town, South Africa
- Years active: 3
- Most recent: April 30, 2026; 6 months ago
- Next event: 2027; 1 year's time
- Attendance: 34,000 (2026)
- Organiser: RX Africa (part of RELX)
- Sponsor: Toyota; Capitec; The City of Cape Town
- Website: comicconafrica.co.za/ccct-home-page

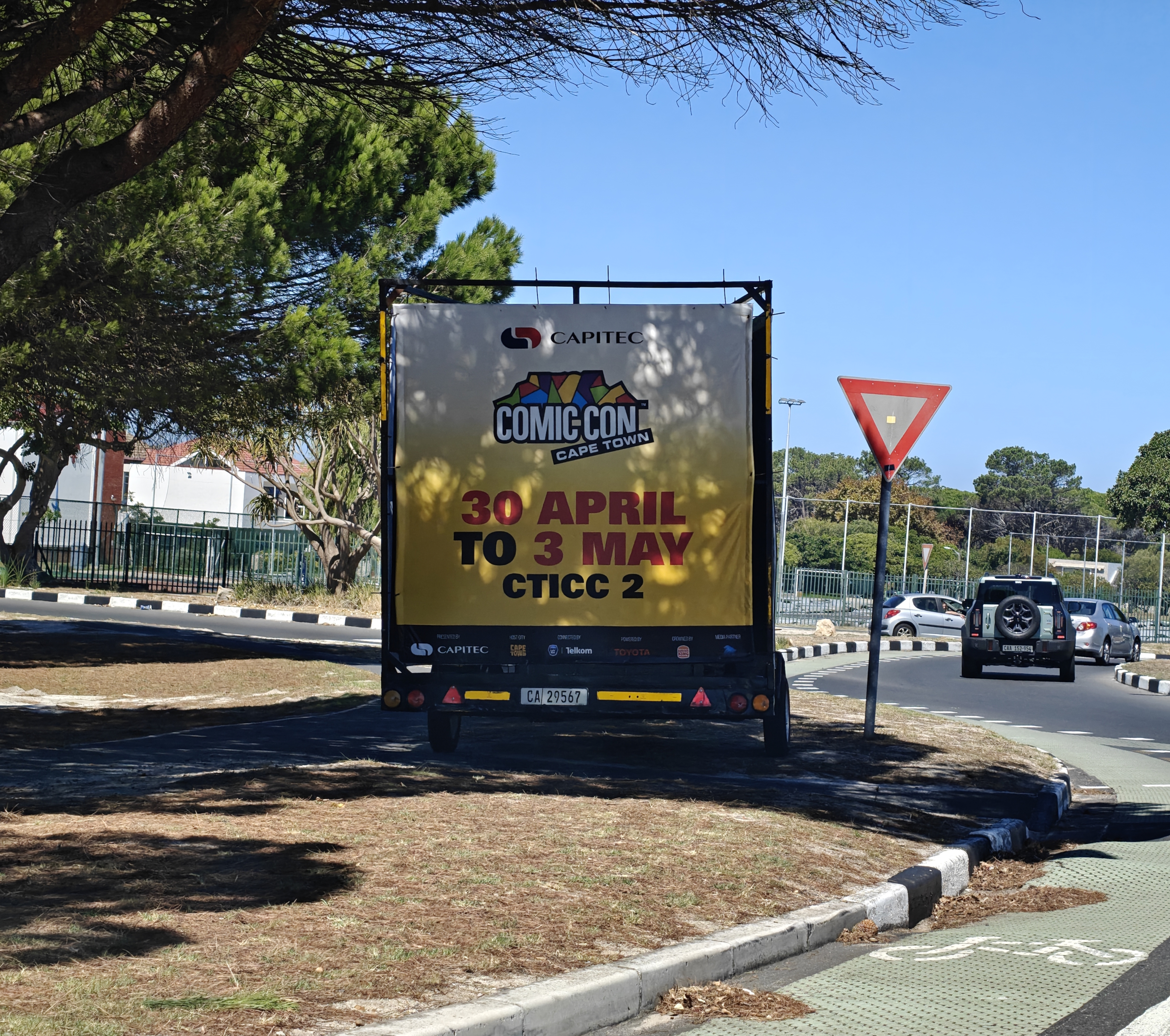
Comic Con Cape Town 2026 billboard in Meadowridge

Comic Con Cape Town (CCCT) is a comic convention held annually around April in Cape Town, South Africa. Founded in 2023 and held at the CTICC, the convention is exceptionally popular among Capetonians who appreciate "nerd/geek culture", anime, comic books, superhero fiction, and cosplay. CCCT hosts cosplay competitions, local arts and crafts stalls, international speakers, and community panels with presentations and Q&As.

== History ==
The first Comic Con Cape Town took place in April 2023. The event's organizers, RX Africa (then Reed Exhibitions), were already hosting a comic con in Joburg, and were receiving an increasing number of requests over the years to start a similar event in Cape Town. The inaugural CCCT was held at the CTICC, Cape Town's main convention center, which has served as the event's venue since.

At the time, Comic Con Director Carla Massmann said, "With such a vibrant city and creative community, Cape Town has set a high standard for itself. This is a self-expressive festival where visitors can experience the best in pop culture and enjoy a tangible experience of brands and fandoms. We are striving for a festival and show program that is as dynamic as the city itself".

The first event hosted 60 artists, various other vendors, and multiple international guest speakers. It also included a daily casual cosplay competition, and the Comic Con Cape Town Regional Championships of Cosplay. The latter featured four categories; the Regional Champion, Masters Champion, Champion of Needlework, and Champion of Armor.

In February 2024, the City of Cape Town (metro government) announced that it would sponsor Comic Con Cape Town for the period 2024 through 2026, via the former's Events Department. The City stated that it believed CCCT would continue building from the success of its inaugural event.

Comic Con Cape Town 2025's tickets were completely sold out.

Having increased its ticket sales to 34,000 for the 2026 event, it was announced that for the 2027 year, CCCT would move from the smaller CTICC 2 to the larger CTICC 1 venue. The next Comic Con expects to welcome around 40,000 visitors.

== Features ==
The event caters to numerous fandoms, and is home to activities and environments including:

- Panels, interactive workshops, and Q&As, across a variety of topics
- Guest speakers, including internationally acclaimed artists, cosplayers, and actors
- The Comic Con Cape Town Regional Championships of Cosplay
- A daily casual cosplay competition
- Art and craft vendors, across two CTICC floors, including local artists in the Artist Alley who have worked with major comic book publishers, such as DC Comics and Marvel Comics
- A video game area, with hardware displays
- A large, outdoor patio space with food trucks featuring a variety of cuisines

== List of conventions ==
Past and upcoming Comic Con Cape Town events are listed in the table below.

List of Comic Con Cape Town events
Name	Dates	Attendance	Ref
CCCT 2023 *	27 April through 30 April 2023	27,484	
CCCT 2024	27 April through 1 May 2024	32,000+	
CCCT 2025	1 May through 4 May 2025	Not published	
CCCT 2026	30 April through 3 May 2026	34,000	
CCCT 2027	TBD	-	

* Inaugural event

== See also ==
- Comic con
