= Monarch (American TV series) =

2022 American drama television series

- Promotional poster
- Genre: Drama
- Created by: Melissa London Hilfers
- Starring: Anna Friel; Trace Adkins; Joshua Sasse; Beth Ditto; Meagan Holder; Susan Sarandon; Martha Higareda; Emma Milani
- Opening theme: "The Card You Gamble"
- Composer: Caitlyn Smith
- Country of origin: United States
- Original language: English
- No. of seasons: 1
- No. of episodes: 11

Production
- Executive producers: Jon Feldman; Hend Baghdady; Gail Berman; Jason Ensler; Melissa London Hilfers; Jason Owen
- Producers: Daniel Beaty; Tian Jun Gu
- Running time: 44 minutes
- Production companies: The Jackal Group; Sandbox Entertainment; Oh That Gus, Inc.; London Calling, Inc.; Fox Entertainment Studios

Original release
- Network: Fox
- Release: September 11 – December 6, 2022

Monarch is an American musical drama television series about a country music family. Created by Melissa London Hilfers, the series is the first production of Fox Entertainment Studios.

Susan Sarandon stars as Dottie Cantrell, with Trace Adkins, Anna Friel, Beth Ditto, Martha Higareda, and Joshua Sasse forming the main cast. The series premiered on September 11, 2022, and ended on December 6, 2022, on Fox. In December 2022, Fox canceled the series after one season.

== Premise ==
Dottie and Albie Roman lead a country music dynasty at the center of a multigenerational family drama. Daughter Nicky Roman does all she can to protect the dynasty's reign in country music while ensuring her own stardom.

== Cast and characters ==
=== Main ===
- Anna Friel as Nicolette "Nicky" Roman: Dottie and Albie's daughter who struggles to live up to her family's legacy.
  - Taegan Burns as young Nicky
- Trace Adkins as Albie Roman: Dottie's husband and a legendary singer-songwriter known as the "Texas Truthteller".
- Joshua Sasse as Luke Roman: Dottie and Albie's son and the CEO of Monarch Records.
  - Gavin Bedell as young Luke
- Beth Ditto as Georgina "Gigi" Taylor-Roman: Dottie and Albie's younger daughter who shunned the spotlight.
  - Elena Murray as young Gigi
- Meagan Holder as Kayla Taylor-Roman: Gigi's wife.
- Susan Sarandon as Dottie Cantrell Roman: the "Queen of Country Music".
  - Mandy Barnett as the singing voice of Dottie
  - Eva Amurri as young Dottie, as seen in flashbacks. Amurri is the real-life daughter of Sarandon.
- Emma Milani as Ana Phoenix: an up-and-coming artist hoping to sign with Monarch.
- Martha Higareda as Catt Phoenix: Ana's mother, who has a link to the Roman family's past.

=== Recurring ===
- Adam Croasdell as Clive Grayson: Nicky's adulterous husband who works in the film industry.
- Ava Grace as Tatum Grayson: Nicky and Clive's adopted daughter.
- Faith Prince as Nellie Cantrell: Dottie's sister.
- Callum Kerr as Wade Stellings: a hot new artist signed to Monarch Records.
- Libby Blake as Marybeth Oldenburg: a medical examiner.
- Kevin Cahoon as Earl Clark: Dottie's faithful personal assistant.
- D. W. Moffett as Tripp DeWitt: the district attorney of the Roman family.
- Damon Dayoub as Jamie Burke: a music producer who begins working with Albie and later becomes Nicky's love interest.

=== Guest stars ===
- Martina McBride as herself
- Shania Twain as herself
- Little Big Town as themselves
- Caitlyn Smith as herself
- Tanya Tucker as herself
- Devan Katherine as Imogen Lowe
- Gabriela Hernandez as Rosa Flores

== Episodes ==
No.	Title	Directed by	Written by	Original release date	Prod. code	U.S. viewers (millions)
1	"Stop at Nothing"	Jason Ensler	Melissa London Hilfers	September 11, 2022	MRC101	4.03
Dottie Roman, the Queen of Country Music, and her husband Albie are interviewed in advance of receiving a CMA lifetime achievement award when a reporter (played by Josh Rhett Noble) asks her whether her reluctance to perform is due to a rumored cancer diagnosis. Dottie tries to brush it off but, when the reporter persists, Albie punches him and Dottie's diagnosis is made public. As news spreads, Nicky, their daughter and an aspiring artist struggling to escape from her family's shadow, and Luke, their son and CEO of Monarch Records, try to handle the fallout by promoting the planned family tour as a tribute to Dottie, though the promoter warns that, without Dottie performing, they are considering pulling their funding if an upcoming preview show is not successful. Nicky asks her sister Gigi to perform at the showcase with her but she refuses, stating that she is done fighting for the love of their parents, while Luke and Albie clash over the former's management of Monarch. Dottie convinces Gigi to perform by telling her to do it for her siblings and convinces Luke not to leave Monarch by pledging to leave her shares in the company to him when she dies. After the show, Albie confesses that he cheated on Dottie when they first got married and she reveals that she's always known and promises to love him forever. Nicky deduces that Dottie leaked the news of her diagnosis in an effort to go out on her own terms. Dottie asks Nicky to help her commit suicide and, though reluctant, she agrees. In her final moments, Dottie confesses to doing things that cannot be forgiven. Gigi arrives and catches Nicky holding a bottle of empty pills by their mother, who is unresponsive. In a flashforward, Albie buries a body.
2	"There Can Only Be One Queen"	Valerie Weiss	Melissa London Hilfers	September 20, 2022	MRC102	1.72
Gigi agrees to keep Nicky's part in Dottie's death a secret to avoid fracturing of the family, but their relationship becomes strained. Luke becomes suspicious of his mother's sudden passing and begins to suspect that Albie was responsible after hearing that they had an argument, leading to a physical confrontation. Gigi is declared the "new Queen of country" and is encouraged by Nellie to step out of her sister's shadow. At the will reading, Luke, Nicky and Gigi argue over the Dottie's legacy and the future of the family. Aspiring artist Ana and her mother Catt have their meeting with Monarch cancelled following Dottie's death, leaving Ana dejected but Catt convinces her not to give up hope. During Dottie's funeral, Albie refuses to perform following a song dispute but, after a heart-to-heart with Ace, agrees to sing as long as Ace, who suffers from anxiety, performs as well. Kayla attempts to break off her affair with Luke, feeling guilty about hurting Gigi, but Luke convinces her that they must live in the present and they kiss, which is seen by Nicky. Luke becomes convinced that Nicky is hiding something after finding out that she forged goodbye letters from Dottie. In the flashforward, the Police arrive at the Romans' to interview Albie.
3	"Show Them Who You Are, Baby"	Chris Grismer	Michael Rauch	September 27, 2022	MRC103	1.76
4	"Not Our First Rodeo"	Elodie Keene	Teleplay by : Gina Fattore & Emily Whitesell; Story by : Francisca X. Hu & Leo Richardson	October 4, 2022	MRC104	1.61
5	"Death and Christmas"	Valerie Weiss	Melissa London Hilfers	October 11, 2022	MRC105	1.67
6	"The Night Of..."	Chris Grismer	Teleplay by : Jon Feldman; Story by : Tian Jun Gu and Scott Shepherd	October 18, 2022	MRC108	1.57
7	"About Last Night"	Jay Chandrasekhar	Teleplay by : Matt Pyken & Emily Whitesell; Story by : Emmylou Diaz & Joy Greggory and Matt Pyken & Emily Whitesell	October 25, 2022	MRC107	1.73
8	"The Crown"	Chris Manley	Daniel Beaty & Alexa Junge	November 8, 2022	MRC106	1.61
9	"Confessions"	Milan Cheylov	Teleplay by : Jon Feldman; Story by : Scott Shepherd	November 15, 2022	MRC109	1.43
10	"Mergers and Propositions"	Gina Lamar	Robert Hull & Matt Pyken	November 29, 2022	MRC110	1.85
11	"The Last Dance"	Chris Grismer	Melissa London Hilfers & Jon Feldman	December 6, 2022	MRC111	1.59

== Truthteller 1839 ==
Tying into the first season's 7th episode ("About Last Night"), Fox Entertainment partnered with ReserveBar and Next Century Spirits to create a "new double-barreled straight bourbon whiskey" named Truthteller 1839. The whiskey took its name from Albie Roman's legendary moniker – The Texas Truthteller – and the product was featured in show as part of the Monarch empire's latest business venture.

== Production ==
=== Development ===
The series was announced in May 2021. It is created and executive produced by Melissa London Hilfers. Michael Rauch was the original showrunner and one of the executive producers but he was replaced by Jon Feldman in November 2021. Other executive producers are Hend Baghdady, Gail Berman and Jason Owen. The episodes will be hour-long. Jason Ensler has been tapped to direct and executive produce the two-part pilot. Principal photography for the series began on September 13, 2021, and concluded on March 31, 2022, in Atlanta, Georgia. On December 7, 2022, it was announced that the series was cancelled after one season by Fox.

=== Casting ===
In September 2021 Susan Sarandon, Trace Adkins, Beth Ditto, Josh Sasse, Megan Holder, Inigo Dominic Pascual, Martha Higareda and Emma Milani were announced to join the series in leading roles along with the recurring cast: Eva Amurri, Adam Croasdell and Faith Prince. In November 2021, Callum Kerr, Kevin Cahoon, Reshma Shetty, Damon Dayoub and D.W. Moffett were announced to join the series' recurring cast. On August 17, 2022, a trailer for the series revealed that several country stars would appear in the show as themselves, including Shania Twain, Martina McBride, Tanya Tucker and Little Big Town.

== Release ==
The series was originally scheduled to premiere on January 30, 2022. On January 12, 2022, Fox announced that due to COVID-19-related issues and the change in showrunner impacting production, and to allow for reshoots and a more thorough promotional campaign, the premiere of Monarch had been delayed to fall 2022. The series premiered on September 11, 2022, as a lead out of Fox's NFL coverage, with the pilot airing four times in a timespan of four days.

== Music ==
The title track of the series "The Card You Gamble", which was written by Nashville songwriters Liz Rose, Lori McKenna and Hillary Lindsey and performed by singer-songwriter Caitlyn Smith, was released on January 14, 2022. On August 3, 2022, "American Cowgirl", a song written by Casey Brown, Heather Morgan and Monarch music supervisor Adam Anders which is performed by Friel's character Nicky in the show, was released. The series features a mixture of original and cover songs and is released through Arista Records.

Episode	Song	Writer(s)	Performer(s)
1.1: Stop at Nothing	"American Cowgirl"	Adam Anders Casey Brown, Heather Morgan	Anna Friel as Nicky Roman
1.1: Stop at Nothing	"The Brambles"	Adam Anders, Tom Douglas, Jordan Shellhart	Trace Adkins as Albie Roman and Anna Friel as Nicky Roman
1.1: Stop at Nothing	"Family Tradition"	Hank Williams Jr.	Joshua Sasse as Luke Roman, Anna Friel as Nicky Roman, Beth Ditto as Gigi Roman and Iñigo Pascual as Ace Grayson
1.1: Stop at Nothing	"Good Hearted Woman"	Waylon Jennings, Willie Nelson	Trace Adkins as Albie Roman
1.1: Stop at Nothing	"How Do I Live"	Diane Warren	Anna Friel as Nicky Roman and Beth Ditto as Gigi Roman
1.2: There Can Only Be One Queen	"Man! I Feel Like a Woman!"	Robert John "Mutt" Lange, Shania Twain	Mandy Barnett as Dottie Cantrell Roman and Anna Friel as Nicky Roman
1.2: There Can Only Be One Queen	"Ain't No Sunshine"	Bill Withers	Callum Kerr as Wade Stellings
1.2: There Can Only Be One Queen	"The Card You Gamble"	Hillary Lindsey, Lori McKenna, Liz Rose	Anna Friel as Nicky Roman and Beth Ditto as Gigi Roman
1.2: There Can Only Be One Queen	"Love Can Build a Bridge"	Naomi Judd	Faith Prince as Nellie Cantrell and Mandy Barnett as Dottie Cantrell Roman
1.2: There Can Only Be One Queen	"Photograph"	Johnny McDaid, Ed Sheeran	Iñigo Pascual as Ace Grayson and Trace Adkins as Albie Roman
1.3: Show Them Who You Are, Baby	"Juice"	Eric Frederic, Melissa Jefferson, Sean Small, Sam Sumser, Theron Thomas	Beth Ditto as Gigi Roman
1.3: Show Them Who You Are, Baby	"Breathe"	Stephanie Bentley, Holly Lamar	Anna Friel as Nicky Roman
1.3: Show Them Who You Are, Baby	"God Knows"	Adam Anders, Peer Åström, Tom Douglas	Mandy Barnett as Dottie Cantrell Roman, Beth Ditto as Gigi Roman
1.3: Show Them Who You Are, Baby	"Kerosene"	Steve Earle, Miranda Lambert	Anna Friel as Nicky Roman
1.3: Show Them Who You Are, Baby	"Always on My Mind"	Wayne Carson, Johnny Christopher, Mark James	Beth Ditto as Gigi Roman and Trace Adkins as Albie Roman
1.4: Not Our First Rodeo	"Watermelon Sugar"	Thomas Hull, Tyler Johnson, Mitch Rowland, Harry Styles	Emma Milani as Ana Phoenix and Iñigo Pascual as Ace Grayson
1.4: Not Our First Rodeo	"High"	Miley Cyrus, Jennifer Decilveo, Caitlyn Smith	Caitlyn Smith as herself
1.4: Not Our First Rodeo	"Mammas Don't Let Your Babies Grow Up to Be Cowboys"	Ed Bruce, Patsy Bruce	Trace Adkins as Albie Roman
1.4: Not Our First Rodeo	"God Knows"	Adam Anders, Peer Åström, Tom Douglas	Anna Friel as Nicky Roman
1.5: Death and Christmas	"Need You Now"	Dave Haywood, Josh Kear, Charles Kelley, Hillary Scott	Anna Friel as Nicky Roman and Callum Kerr as Wade Stellings
1.5: Death and Christmas	"Born This Way"	Lady Gaga, Jeppe Laursen	Beth Ditto as Gigi Roman
1.5: Death and Christmas	"Silent Night"	Franz Xaver Gruber	Anna Friel as Nicky Roman, Beth Ditto as Gigi Roman, Joshua Sasse as Luke Roman and Iñigo Pascual as Ace Grayson
1.6: The Night Of...	"Somethin' Bad"	Chuck Ainlay, Frank Liddell, Glenn Worf	Anna Friel as Nicky Roman and Beth Ditto as Gigi Roman
1.6: The Night Of...	"Friends in Low Places"	Dewayne Blackwell, Earl Bud Lee	Trace Adkins as Albie Roman
1.7: About Last Night	"Waiting Around to Die"	Townes Van Zandt	Trace Adkins as Albie Roman
1.7: About Last Night	"Half of My Hometown"	Jimmy Robbins, Shane McAnally, Ross Copperman, Nicolle Galyon & Kelsea Ballerini	Emma Milani as Ana Phoenix and Trace Adkins as Albie Roman
1.7: About Last Night	"I Love a Rainy Night"	Even Stevens, David Malloy & Eddie Rabbitt	Anna Friel as Nicky Roman and Callum Kerr as Wade Stellings
1.8: The Crown	"Strawberry Wine"	Matraca Berg & Gary Harrison	Anna Friel as Nicky Roman
1.8: The Crown	"Something to Talk About"	Shirley Eikhard	Emma Milani as Ana Phoenix
1.8: The Crown	"This One's for the Girls"	Hillary Lindsey, Chris Lindsey & Aimee Mayo	Iñigo Pascual as Ace Grayson
1.9: Confessions	"Country Boy (Shake It for Me)"	Dallas Davidson & Luke Bryan	Anna Friel as Nicky Roman
1.9: Confessions	"Gates of Hell"	Tom Douglas & Adam Anders	Trace Adkins as Albie Roman
1.9: Confessions	"Before He Cheats"	Josh Kear & Chris Tompkins	Beth Ditto as Gigi Roman
1.9: Confessions	"Fresh Eyes"	Andy Grammer, Ross Golan & Ian Kirkpatrick	Emma Milani as Ana Phoenix and Iñigo Pascual as Ace Grayson

== Reception ==
=== Critical response ===
The review aggregator website Rotten Tomatoes reported a 33% approval rating with an average rating of 5.8/10, based on 12 critic reviews. The website's critics consensus reads, "Heavy on the clichés while disappointingly light on Susan Sarandon, this Monarch is a so-so successor to a lineage of soaps about families warring over their business empire." Metacritic, which uses a weighted average, assigned a score of 43 out of 100 based on 11 critics, indicating "mixed or average reviews".

=== Ratings ===
Viewership and ratings per episode of Monarch
No.	Title	Air date	Rating (18–49)	Viewers (millions)	DVR (18–49)	DVR viewers (millions)	Total (18–49)	Total viewers (millions)
1	"Stop at Nothing"	September 11, 2022	0.9	4.03	—N/a	—N/a	—N/a	—N/a
2	"There Can Only Be One Queen"	September 20, 2022	0.2	1.72	0.2	1.45	0.4	3.17
3	"Show Them Who You Are, Baby"	September 27, 2022	0.2	1.76	0.1	1.26	0.4	3.02
4	"Not Our First Rodeo"	October 4, 2022	0.2	1.61	0.1	1.19	0.3	2.80
5	"Death and Christmas"	October 11, 2022	0.2	1.67	0.1	0.99	0.3	2.67
6	"The Night Of..."	October 18, 2022	0.2	1.57	0.1	1.08	0.3	2.65
7	"About Last Night"	October 25, 2022	0.2	1.73	0.01	0.96	0.3	2.69
8	"The Crown"	November 8, 2022	0.2	1.61	0.1	1.06	0.3	2.67
9	"Confessions"	November 15, 2022	0.2	1.43	0.1	1.01	0.3	2.44
10	"Mergers and Propositions"	November 29, 2022	0.2	1.85	—N/a	—N/a	—N/a	—N/a
11	"The Last Dance"	December 6, 2022	0.2	1.59	0.1	0.74	0.3	2.33 (Note: Live+7 ratings were unavailable, so Live+3 ratings have been used instead.)
