= Holywater Tech =

Ukrainian technology company

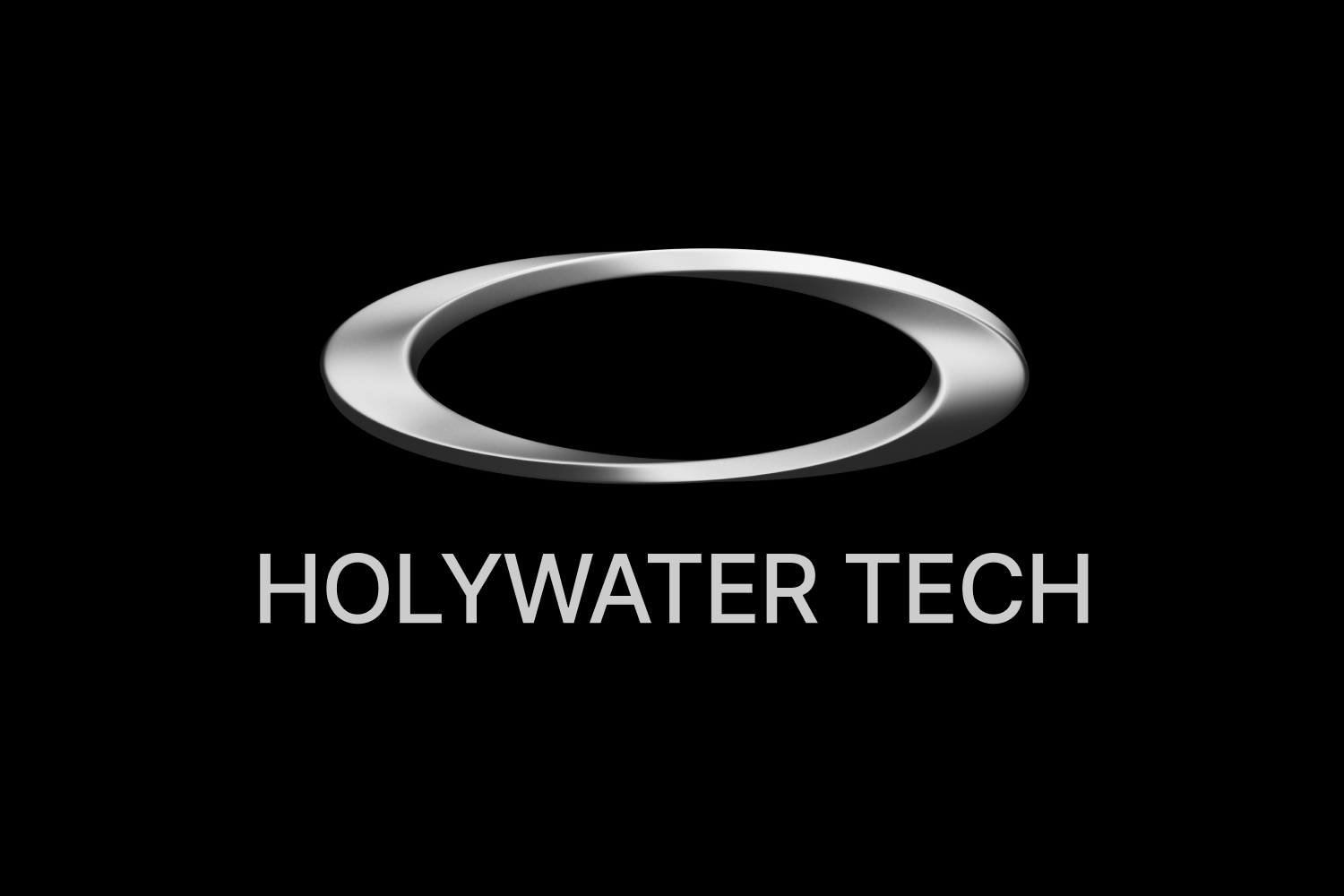
- Type: Private
- Industry: Tech, IT, AI
- Founded: 2020
- Founders: Bogdan Nesvit, Anatolii Kasianov
- Area served: United States, Germany, France, United Kingdom
- Key people: Bogdan Nesvit (co-CEO), Anatolii Kasianov (co-CEO)
- Products: My Passion, My Drama, My Muse
- Number of employees: 200 (2026)
- Website: https://holywater.tech/

Holywater Tech (stylized in all-caps) is a technology company that specializes in artificial intelligence (AI), the development and publication of books, audiobooks, interactive stories, and video series for its proprietary applications. One of its apps, My Drama, won the Webby Award in 2025. The platform was inspired by the Microdrama format.

== History ==
Holywater Tech was founded in early 2020 in Kyiv, Ukraine, by Bogdan Nesvit and Anatolii Kasianov. The company's initial team consisted of six members, and its first application, a live wallpapers and fonts app, generated $100,000 in monthly revenue within two months of its launch..

In 2021, it shifted its focus towards building a content ecosystem, particularly by creating interactive story games and My Passion, a mobile application for books. In 2022, the company exited the app business, selling its portfolio of applications.

In 2025, Holywater Tech introduced My Muse, an AI-powered platform for generating series.

In 2025, the company received strategic investment from Fox Entertainment, aimed at expanding content creation capabilities and producing over 200 vertical video series.

In January 2026, Holywater Tech raised $22 million in a funding round led by Horizon Capital, with participation from U.S. investors including Endeavor Catalyst and Wheelhouse. The funding is intended to support the expansion of its My Drama mobile-first streaming platform and the development of its AI-based content ecosystem.

In February 2026, Holywater Tech acquired the AI-VFX studio Jeynix to integrate AI-driven workflows into its production and localization processes. Following the acquisition, the company officially rebranded as Holywater Tech to reflect its shift toward an AI-first technology identity.

=== My Drama ===
In 2024, the company launched My Drama, a platform for streaming vertical video series, designed for modern mobile audiences.

Holywater Tech operates My Drama, a vertical video streaming platform that adapts selected titles from its book service My Passion into original series using AI-driven audience data.

In May 2025, the My Drama app won a Webby Award and was named the Best Streaming Service of 2025 by the Webby Awards.

In August 2025, the francophone Canadian newspaper La Presse reported that MyDrama had become the dominant platform for vertical short dramas in Europe.

In early 2026, the company entered a partnership with FOX Entertainment and content creator Dhar Mann to produce a slate of 40 original vertical microdrama series. The content is set to debut exclusively on the My Drama platform, with global distribution handled by FOX Entertainment Global.

== Overview ==
Holywater Tech develops and publishes the following applications, among which is a book app, a content platform My Muse and My Drama, a platform for streaming vertical video series, offering mobile users short episodes (1–2 minutes). The platform ranks among the top platforms in its niche in Europe and the United States.

As of January 2026, the company’s applications have been installed over 100 million times.

In collaboration with Vivat Publishing, the company Holywater Tech also launched the project "PYSHY" — a contest for authors in the romantic fiction genre aimed at promoting their work internationally. Out of 444 submissions, a book by author Stephanie Lin became the basis for the vertical series Young Elite. The series became a hit in the U.S. and Europe, garnering over 10 million views on the vertical series platform My Drama.

== Products ==
Holywater Tech is developing an ecosystem comprising the following products:

- My Passion — a book app.
- My Drama — a platform for vertical video series offering short episodes (1–2 minutes) tailored to a modern audience. My Drama ranks among the top platforms in its niche in Europe and the United States.
- My Muse — a platform for vertical series produced with the support of AI.

The company’s apps have been downloaded more than 100 million users in total, with over a million new users every month.
