= Fox Entertainment =

American entertainment company

- Type: Division
- Industry: Entertainment
- Predecessor: Fox Entertainment Group
- Founded: March 20, 2019; 7 years ago
- Headquarters: 1211 Avenue of the Americas, New York City, United States
- Key people: Rob Wade (president and CEO)
- Services: Film and television production
- Parent: Fox Corporation
- Divisions: Fox Broadcasting Company; Fox Entertainment Studios; Fox Entertainment Animation; Fox Entertainment Global
- Subsidiaries: Bento Box Entertainment; MarVista Entertainment; Meet Cute; Blockchain Creative Labs; Fox Studio Lot, LLC
- Website: Official website

Fox Entertainment is an American entertainment company owned by Fox Corporation that is involved in television production and distribution. The company was formed in 2019 after the Walt Disney Company's acquisition of 21st Century Fox, with offices in Midtown Manhattan and Los Angeles, California. The company is the successor to the Fox Entertainment Group, which shut down and merged with the Walt Disney Studios in 2019. Fox Entertainment's programming is created for the Fox Broadcasting Company and Tubi; Fox First Run serves as the syndication arm of the former, as well as a television distribution company for Fox Television Stations. The company formerly served as the production arm for Fox, having been replaced by Fox Entertainment Studios.

== History ==
Fox Entertainment emerged in 2019 subsequent to the acquisition of Fox's former television studio, 20th Century Fox Television, along with other assets acquired by Disney. On August 6, 2019, Fox Entertainment expanded its portfolio by acquiring the animation studio Bento Box Entertainment. Subsequent developments included a collaboration with Caffeine in April 2020 to produce the AniDom Beyond Show, hosted by Andy Richter. Initially intending to foster scripted and unscripted projects through a division called Sidecar, aimed at developing content for both Fox's broadcast network and external platforms, Fox later dissolved Sidecar in June 2020, citing the impact of the COVID-19 pandemic on the industry.

In August 2021, Fox Entertainment entered into an overall deal with Gordon Ramsay to establish Studio Ramsay Global, which absorbed Ramsay's pre-existing business with All3Media and would oversee his future endeavors. September 2021 saw Fox Entertainment's acquisition of TMZ from WarnerMedia for approximately $50 million. Subsequent developments included signing Wonwoo Park, creator of the South Korean format King of Mask Singer, which had been adapted by Fox as The Masked Singer, to a first-look deal in November 2021, and the acquisition of television film studio MarVista Entertainment in December 2021, with an emphasis on content production for its streaming service Tubi. Exploring content for internal Fox streaming service Fox Nation, the entertainment division created new episodes of Cops and a follow-up to A&E series Duck Dynasty called Duck Family Treasure.

Further expansion occurred in February 2022 with the acquisition of the Gumby franchise. In September 2022, Fox Corporation launched Fox Entertainment Studios, its inaugural foray into wholly in-house television production, premiering its first show, Monarch, on September 11, 2022. Additionally, Fox Entertainment re-entered the international distribution arena by establishing Fox Entertainment Global.

In January 2023, Fox Entertainment and Hulu announced a new multi-year deal encompassing in-season streaming rights for Fox's primetime shows. By July 2023, Fox Entertainment declared its commitment to television production in Ireland, establishing the largest unscripted production hub and confirming its role as the global hub for the American hit cooking competition series Next Level Chef with Gordon Ramsay. Amid the 2023 Actors' and Writers' strikes, the entertainment division underwent a realignment to strengthen alignment with its parent entity, Fox Corporation.

On March 27, 2024, Fox Entertainment's operations were restructured into three groups: Fox Television Network, Fox Entertainment Studios and Fox Entertainment Global, with Fernando Szew named as head of the second unit. Around 30 employees were subsequently laid off in July 2024.

In October 2025, Fox Entertainment invested in vertical video company Holywater. As part of the deal, Fox Entertainment Studios will create and produce more than 200 vertical video titles in the Duanju format for My Drama over the next two years.

In November 2025, Fox Entertainment acquired rom-com podcast company Meet Cute.

== Filmography ==
=== Television ===
Title	Genre	First air date	Last air date	Number of seasons	Network	Co-production company(s)	Notes
What Just Happened??! with Fred Savage	Parody	June 30, 2019	September 1, 2019	1	Fox	The Crest Lamp Company, Double Hemm, and 20th Century Fox Television	
BH90210	Drama	August 7, 2019	September 11, 2019	1	Fox	Alberghini Chessler Productions and CBS Studios	
Prodigal Son	Crime drama	September 23, 2019	May 18, 2021	2	Fox	Berlanti Productions, Sklaverworth Productions, VHPT! Co., and Warner Bros. Television	
Bless the Harts	Animated sitcom	September 29, 2019	June 20, 2021	2	Fox	Jessebean, Inc., Lord Miller Productions, and 20th Television	
The Moodys	Sitcom	December 4, 2019	June 20, 2021	2	Fox	CBS Studios	
Outmatched	Sitcom	January 23, 2020	March 26, 2020	1	Fox	Briskets Big Yellow House and 20th Century Fox Television	
Duncanville	Animated sitcom	February 16, 2020	June 26, 2022	3	Fox	Paper Kite Productions, Scullys, Bento Box Entertainment, Universal Television, 20th Television (seasons 1–2), and 20th Television Animation (season 3)	Last six episodes released on Hulu on October 18
Filthy Rich	Drama	September 21, 2020	November 30, 2020	1	Fox	Imagine Television, Wyolah Films, and 20th Century Fox Television	
Next	Science fiction	October 6, 2020	December 22, 2020	1	Fox	Manny Coto Productions, Zaftig Films, and 20th Century Fox Television	
Call Me Kat	Sitcom	January 3, 2021	May 4, 2023	3	Fox	Farm Kid (season 1), Sad Clown Productions, That's Wonderful Productions, BBC Studios America, and Warner Bros. Television	Based on Miranda
The Great North	Animated sitcom	January 3, 2021	September 14, 2025	5	Fox	Double Molyneux Sister Sheux, Wilo Productions, 20th Television (season 1), and 20th Television Animation (seasons 2–5)	
HouseBroken	Animated sitcom	May 31, 2021	August 6, 2023	2	Fox	Kapital Entertainment, Bento Box Entertainment, Merman, and Allenden	Uncredited
Fantasy Island	Fantasy	August 10, 2021	May 8, 2023	2	Fox	Happier in Hollywood and Gemstone Studios	
The Big Leap	Dramedy	September 20, 2021	December 6, 2021	1	Fox	20th Television, Naegle Ink, Small Dog Picture Company, and Selfish Mermaid	Based on Big Ballet
Our Kind of People	Serial drama	September 21, 2021	January 25, 2022	1	Fox	20th Television, Lee Daniels Entertainment, The Gist of It Productions, and Electus	
Cops	Reality	October 1, 2021	Present	4	Fox Nation	Langley Productions	Previously aired on Fox before moving to Paramount Network; reacquired by Fox
The Cleaning Lady	Crime drama	January 3, 2022	June 3, 2025	4	Fox	Warner Bros. Television, ShadowDance Pictures, Amore + Vita Productions, Inc., and Laughing Monkeys	Based on the Argentine TV series of the same name
Pivoting	Sitcom	January 9, 2022	March 10, 2022	1	Fox	Warner Bros. Television, Mama Look! Productions, and Kapital Entertainment	
Welcome to Flatch	Sitcom	March 17, 2022	February 2, 2023	2	Fox	Lionsgate Television, Feigco Entertainment, BBC Studios America, and Perkins Street Productions	Based on This Country
Duck Family Treasure	Reality	June 19, 2022	Present	3	Fox Nation	Fox Nation, Tread Lively, Warm Springs Productions, and Duck Commander	Follow-up to Duck Dynasty series, originally aired on A&E Networks
Alert: Missing Persons Unit	Police drama	January 8, 2023	May 27, 2025	3	Fox	Whale Productions, Foxxhole Productions, and Sony Pictures Television	
Accused	Crime anthology	January 22, 2023	December 3, 2024	2	Fox	Teakwood Lane Productions, Sony Pictures Television, and All3Media International	Based on the British TV series of the same name
Rescue: HI-Surf	Action drama	September 22, 2024	March 31, 2025	1	Fox	John Wells Productions and Warner Bros. Television	
Murder in a Small Town	Crime drama	September 24, 2024	Present	2	Fox	Sepia Films and Future Shack Entertainment	Based on the novels by L. R. Wright; originally aired on Global in Canada
Celebrity Weakest Link	Game show	September 15, 2025	Present	1	Fox	BBC Studios Los Angeles	Based on the British TV series of the same name Replaced Universal Television Alternative Studio
Memory of a Killer	Crime drama	January 25, 2026	Present	1	Fox	Eyeworks, Welle Entertainment and Warner Bros. Television	Based on The Alzheimer Case
Bewitched	Comedy				Fox	Sony Pictures Television	Based on the 1964 series of the same name

=== Film ===
Year	Title	Director	Gross (worldwide)	Distributor	Notes	Ref.
2023	First Time Female Director	Chelsea Peretti	—N/a	Roku	co-production with Paper Kite Productions and MarVista Entertainment.	

== Divisions ==
=== Fox Entertainment Studios ===
Fox Entertainment Studios is a division of Fox Entertainment which produces films and television shows in-house, as opposed to contracting studios. It was founded on September 11, 2022.

Title	Genre	First air date	Last air date	Number of seasons	Network	Co-production company(s)	Note(s)
Monarch	Family drama	September 11, 2022	December 6, 2022	1	Fox	Sandbox Entertainment, The Jackal Group, Oh That Gus, Inc. and London Calling, Inc.	copyright held under "Monarch XOF, LLC"
Animal Control	Sitcom	February 16, 2023	Present	5	Fox	Roughhouse Productions, Middletown News and Wow a Fox	
Going Dutch	Sitcom	January 2, 2025	April 23, 2026	2	Fox	Red Lion Friday Productions and Amoeba	
Doc	Medical drama	January 7, 2025	Present	3	Fox	Avenue K Productions, Channel Road Productions, Lux Vide, 3 Arts Entertainment and Sony Pictures Television	Based on the Italian TV series Doc – Nelle tue mani
One Day in October	Drama	October 7, 2025		1	HBO Max	Yes TV and Moriah Media	based on real-life accounts from the October 7, 2023, attack on Israel
Best Medicine	Medical comedy-drama	January 4, 2026	Present	2	Fox	All3Media International, Tuccillo, Inc. and Propagate Content	Based on Doc Martin
The Faithful: Women of the Bible	Biblical drama	March 22, 2026	April 5, 2026	1	Fox	Siesta Productions and Carol Mendelsohn Productions	Based on the biblical book of the same name
The Well	Documentary	November 9, 2026		1	Hulu	Mountain Top Pictures, Haven Entertainment and Fairvale Entertainment	
Baywatch	Action	January 6, 2027			Fox	Tower 12 Productions, Flying Glass of Milk Productions, Wonderland Sound and Vision and Fremantle North America	Revival of 1989 series
The Interrogator	Spy drama	2027			Fox	Lionsgate Television	
Highway to Heaven	Fantasy drama	2027 or 2028			Fox	Amblin Television and Michael Landon Productions	Based on the 1984 series of the same name
Almost Paradise	Comedy				Fox	Kapital Entertainment	
Billionaire Apocalypse	Drama				Fox		
The Dogwood	Comedy				ABC		
Earthquake	Comedy				Fox	North Hill Productions and 3 Arts Entertainment	
How Can We Help	Political comedy				Fox	Brillstein Entertainment Partners	
Mammoth	Comedy				Fox	BBC Studios Los Angeles	Based on the British series of the same name
Perf	Comedy				Fox		
Proof	Supernatural crime drama				Fox	Westbrook Studios and Aperture Entertainment	Based on the comic book series of the same name
The Miracle Department	Drama				Fox	Okay Goodnight	
Thunderjacks	Sitcom				Fox		
Untitled Jermaine Fowler comedy	Sitcom				Fox		
Untitled Paul Reiser comedy	Sitcom				Fox		
Untitled Vampire Comedy	Sitcom				Fox	Kapital Entertainment and KatCo	
Wine & Spirits	Drama				Fox	Lady Metalmark and 3 Arts Entertainment	

=== Fox Entertainment Animation ===
Fox Entertainment Animation
- Type: Division
- Industry: Television production
- Founded: 2025; 1 year ago
- Headquarters: Los Angeles, California, United States
- Products: Television programs
- Parent: Fox Entertainment Studios
- Website: Official website

Fox Entertainment Animation is a division of Fox Entertainment which produces animated television shows. It was founded in 2025.

Title	First air date	Last air date	Number of seasons	Co-production company(s)	Note(s)
Krapopolis	September 24, 2023	Present	3	Harmonious Claptrap and Bento Box Entertainment	Credited as Fox Entertainment Studios for first two seasons
Grimsburg	January 7, 2024	Present	3	Gizmotech Industries, The Jackal Group and Bento Box Entertainment	Credited as Fox Entertainment Studios for first season and Fox Entertainment for second season
Universal Basic Guys	September 8, 2024	Present	3	Mutsack, One Man Cancoe (season 1), Mediazhka (season 2), Sony Pictures Television, and Bento Box Entertainment	Credited as Fox Entertainment for first season

=== Fox Alternative Entertainment ===
Fox Alternative Entertainment
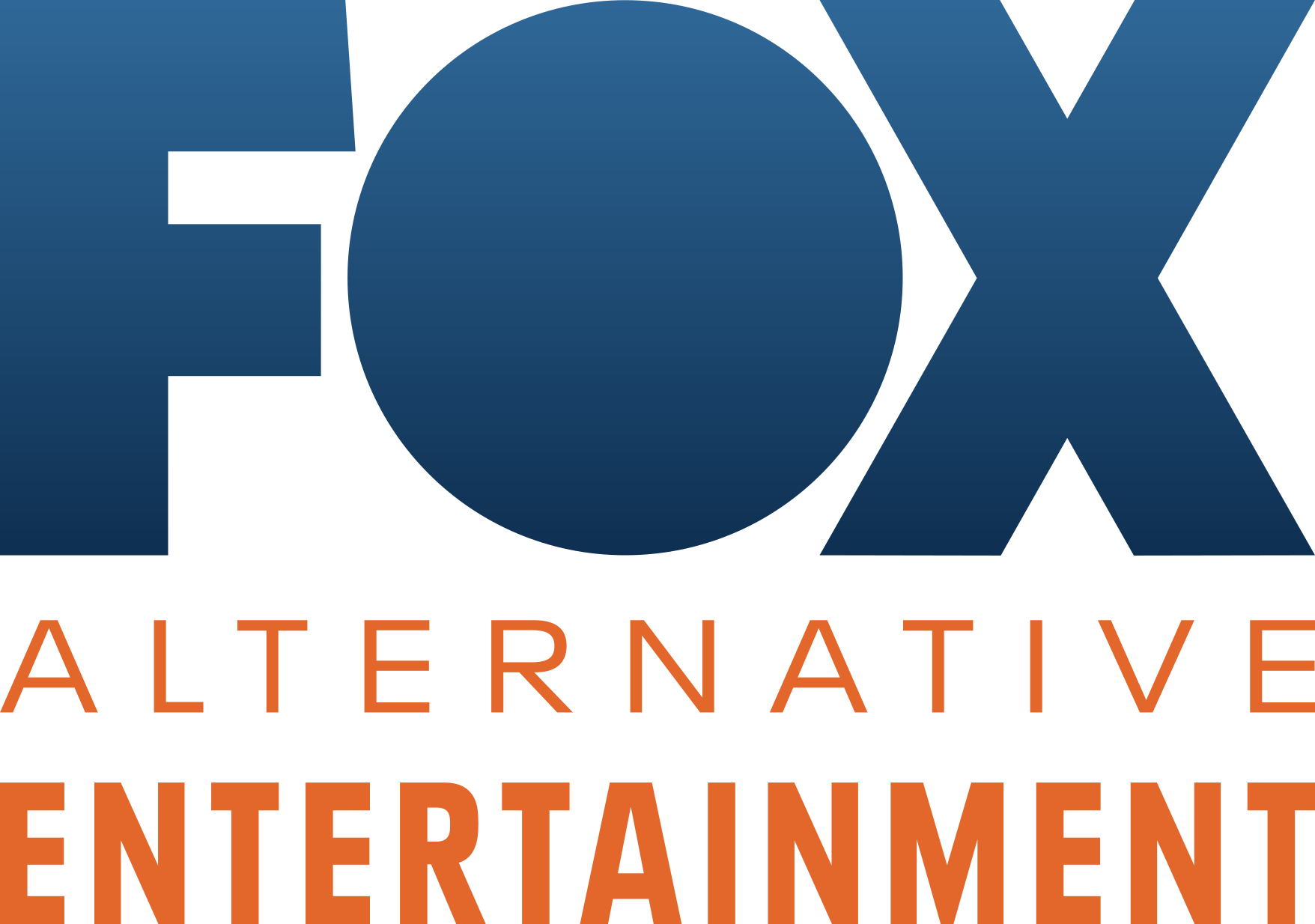
- Type: Division
- Industry: Television production
- Founded: 2019; 7 years ago
- Headquarters: Los Angeles, California, United States
- Key people: John Hesling (head and EVP)
- Products: Television programs
- Parent: Fox Entertainment Studios
- Website: Official website

Fox Alternative Entertainment is Fox Entertainment's in-house studio for unscripted and reality television programming. It also produces reality television series for international networks. It was founded in 2019.

Title	Years	Notes	Network
The Masked Singer	2019–2026	season 2–13, credited as Fox Entertainment Studios for its fourteenth season; co-production with Smart Dog Media and MBC	Fox
Ultimate Tag	2020	co-production with Znak & Co.	Fox
I Can See Your Voice	2020–2024	co-production with CJ ENM	Fox
The Masked Dancer	2020–2021	co-production with A Very Good Production, MBC and Warner Horizon Unscripted Television	Fox
Name That Tune	2021–present	second reboot; co-production with Prestige Entertainment, Eureka Productions (season 1) and BiggerStage (season 2)	Fox
Cherries Wild	2021	co-production with Interrobang Entertainment	Fox
Let's Be Real	2021	co-production with Canal+, Propagate Content and Poochie Doochie Productions	Fox
America's Most Wanted	2021–present	second reboot; co-production with XG Productions	Fox
Crime Scene Kitchen	2021–present	credited as Fox Entertainment for its first season; co-production with Fly on the Wall Entertainment	Fox
The Big Deal	2021	co-production with BiggerStage	Virgin Media One
Alter Ego	2021		Fox
TMZ on TV	2021–present	acquired from Telepictures; co-production with Harvey Levin Productions and ParaMedia	Syndication
Next Level Chef	2022–present	co-production with Studio Ramsay Global	Fox
Joe Millionaire: For Richer or Poorer	2022	co-production with 495 Productions	Fox
Domino Masters	2022	co-production with The Jackal Group	Fox
Kitchen Commando	2023	co-production with Studio Ramsay Global	Tubi
Gordon Ramsay's Food Stars	2023–2024	co-production with Studio Ramsay Global	Fox
Kitchen Nightmares	2023–present	second reboot; co-production with All3Media International and Studio Ramsay Global	Fox
Snake Oil	2023	co-production with Electric Avenue	Fox
We Are Family	2024	co-production with Apploff Entertainment	Fox
The Real Full Monty	2024	co-production with Spun Gold TV	Fox
Extracted	2025–present	co-production with Balboa Productions and B17 Entertainment	Fox
Gordon Ramsay's Secret Service	2025–present	co-production with Studio Ramsay Global	Fox
Next Level Baker	2025–present	co-production with Studio Ramsay Global	Fox
Beat My Mini-Mes	TBA	co-production with TF1	TF1
Marriage Market	TBA	co-production with ProSieben	ProSieben

=== Studio Ramsay Global ===
Studio Ramsay Global is a division of Fox Entertainment led by Gordon Ramsay. Formed as part of an overall deal with Ramsay, the studio is focused on food and lifestyle-related programming. The studio was formed after Fox Entertainment acquired the existing Studio Ramsay from All3Media.

=== Fox First Run ===
Fox First Run
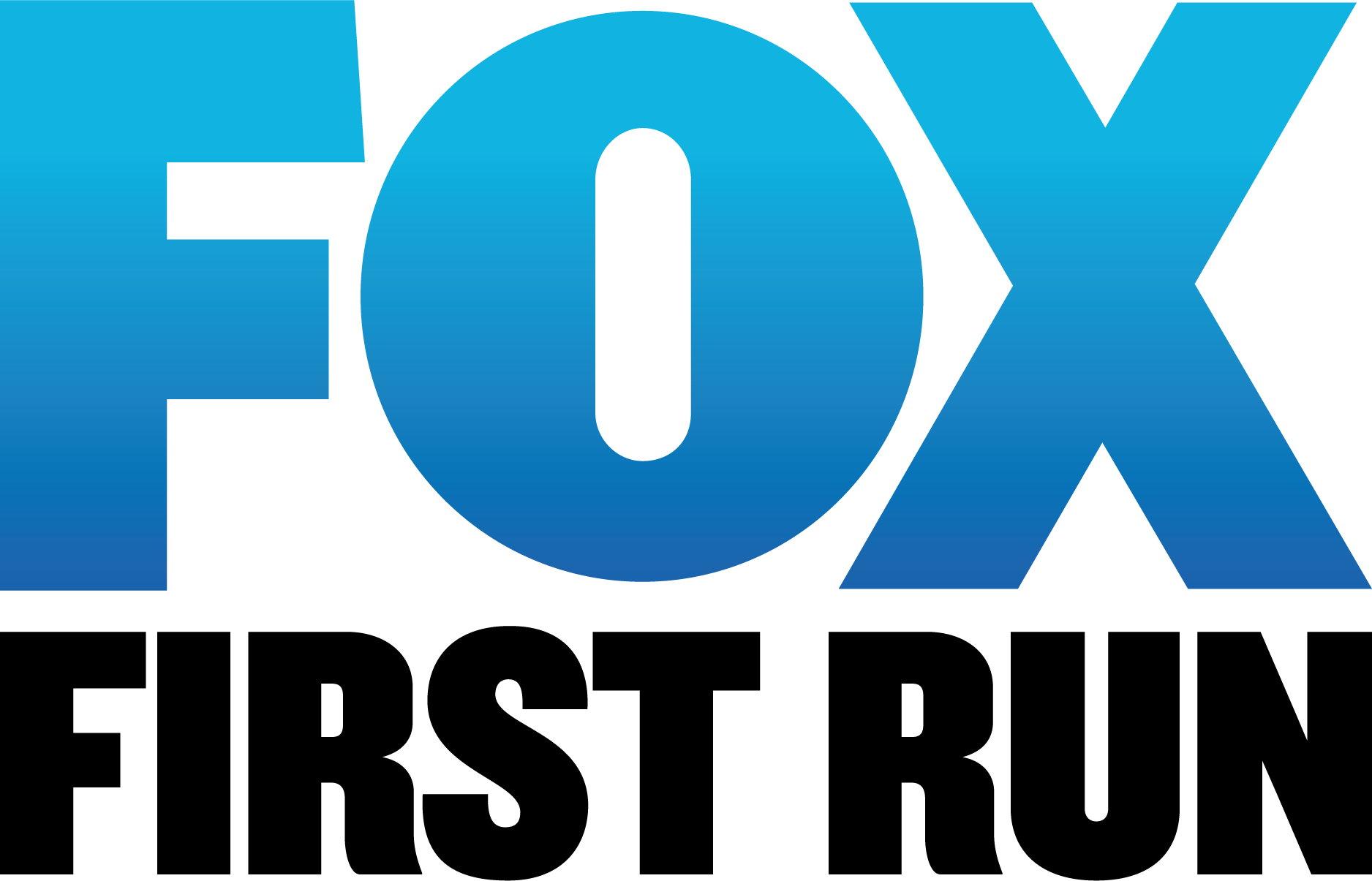
- Type: Division
- Industry: Television syndication
- Predecessor: The original incarnation of 20th Television (The Walt Disney Company)
- Founded: 2019; 7 years ago
- Headquarters: Los Angeles, California, United States
- Key people: Rob Wade (President and CEO, Fox Entertainment)
- Products: Television programs
- Parent: Fox Entertainment
- Website: Official website

Fox First Run is the television syndication arm owned by Fox Corporation. It serves as the syndication arm of Fox Entertainment and the Fox Broadcasting Company. It was founded in 2019. It is also a television syndication/distribution company of Fox Television Stations, which oversees the MyNetworkTV syndication service.

Title	Years	Notes
Dish Nation	2011–2025	co-production with Bartholomew Productions, Giant Bowling Pin Productions, Inc., Dino Bones Productions, Studio City, 20th Television (2011–19) and Georgia Media
Divorce Court	2019–present	co-production with Lincolnwood Drive, Monet Lane Productions, 20th Television and Georgia Media
25 Words or Less	2019–present	co-production with Dino Bones Productions, Is or Isn't Entertainment and Regular Brand
TMZ	2007–present	acquired from Telepictures in 2021; co-production with TMZ Inc., Harvey Levin Productions, ParaMedia and Fox Alternative Entertainment
You Bet Your Life with Jay Leno	2021–2023	co-production with Otter Creek Productions, Werner Entertainment and Big Dog Productions
Pictionary	2022–2025	co-production with Bill's Market & Television Productions, Mattel Television and CBS Media Ventures
Person, Place or Thing	2023–2025	co-production with Dino Bones Productions and Georgia Media
Battleground	2024, 2026	

=== XOF Productions ===
XOF Productions
- Type: Division
- Industry: Television production
- Founded: October 2, 2019; 7 years ago
- Headquarters: Los Angeles, California, United States
- Key people: Rob Wade (President and CEO, Fox Entertainment)
- Products: Television programs
- Parent: Fox Entertainment
- Website: Official website

XOF Productions is a division of Fox Entertainment. Its name is derived from a reversal of "Fox".

Title	Years	Notes
Almost Family	2019–2020	co-production with Parasox, True Jack Productions, Endemol Shine North America, and Universal Television
Deputy	2020	co-production with Cedar Park Entertainment and Entertainment One
