= Megan =

- Pronunciation: Welsh: [ˈmɛɡan], Anglicised: /ˈmɛɡən/ (MEH-gən), /ˈmeɪɡən/ (MAY-gən) or /ˈmiːɡən/ (MEE-gən)
- Gender: Female
- Language: Welsh, English

Origin
- Language: Welsh
- Origin: Ancient Greek
- Meaning: Pearl
- Region of origin: Wales

Other names
- Short form: Meg
- Derived: Margeret
- Related names: Greta; Gretchen; Gretel; Madge; Maggie; Máiréad; Maisie; Margareta; Margarete; Margarida; Margarita; Marge; Margherita; Margie; Margit; Margo; Margot; Marguerite; Peggy; Rita

Megan is a Welsh feminine given name, originally a diminutive form of Margaret. Margaret is from the Greek μαργαρίτης (margarítēs), Latin margarīta, "pearl". Megan is one of the most popular Welsh-language names for women in Wales and England, and is commonly truncated to Meg.

Megan was one of the most popular feminine names in the English-speaking world in the 1990s, peaking in 1990 in the United States and 1999 in the United Kingdom. Approximately 54% of people named Megan born in the US were born in 1990 or later. The name is also frequently spelt Meagan, Meaghan, Meghan, or Mehgan outside of Wales and the rest of the United Kingdom due to spelling influence from Irish-language names.

Meghan, Duchess of Sussex (born Rachel Meghan Markle in 1981), an American former actress and member of the British Royal Family, is one of the highest-profile people with the name.

== Meagan ==
- Meagan Best (born 2002), Barbadian squash player
- Meagan Chauke (born 1992), South African activist
- Meagan Cignoli, American photographer, filmmaker, and businessperson
- Meagan Day, American writer, editor, and activist
- Meagan Dixon (born 1997), Australian WBBL player
- Meagan Duhamel (born 1985), Canadian pair skater
- Meagan Flynn (born 1967), American judge
- Meagan Fuller (born 1992), American beauty pageant titleholder
- Meagan Good (born 1981), American actress
- Meagan Hanson, American attorney and former politician
- Meagan Harbison (born 1995), American-born Dominican footballer
- Meagan Hockaday (died 2015), American murder victim
- Meagan Holder (born 1984), American actress
- Meagan Kiely (born 1994), Australian AFLW player
- Meagan Marie (born 1985), American online community manager and former video game journalist
- Meagan May (born 1991), American softball player
- Meagan McCray (born 1987), American soccer goalkeeper
- Meagan McGrath (born 1977), Canadian aerospace engineer, mountaineer, and explorer
- Meagan McKinney (born 1961), American novelist and biologist
- Meagan Miller, American opera soprano
- Meagan Simonaire (born 1990), American politician
- Meagan Spooner, American science fiction- and fantasy author
- Meagan Tandy (born 1985), American actress and model
- Meagan Warthold (born 1972), Australian weightlifter
- Meagan Winings, American Miss Nebraska USA winner
- Meagan Wolfe, U.S. election official

== Meagen ==
- Meagen Fay (born 1957), American actress
- Meagen Gunemba (born 1995), Papua New Guinean footballer
- Meagen Nay (born 1988), Australian competitive swimmer

== Meaghan ==
- Meaghan Benfeito (born 1989), Canadian diver
- Meaghan Creed, Canadian neuroscientist and associate professor
- Meaghan Delahunt (born 1961), Australian-born Scottish novelist
- Meaghan Dutton-O'Hara, American ballet dancer
- Meaghan Francella (born 1982), American LPGA Tour player
- Meaghan Hughes (born 1986), Canadian curler
- Meaghan Jarensky (born 1978), American model, yoga practitioner, humanist, and advocate of young women
- Meaghan Kall, American epidemiologist
- Meaghan Martin (born 1992), American actress and singer
- Meaghan Mikkelson (born 1985), Canadian PWHPA player
- Meaghan Morris (born 1950), Australian scholar of cultural studies
- Meaghan Nally (born 1998), American NWSL player
- Meaghan Oppenheimer (born 1986), American television and movie screenwriter, producer, actress, and voice artist
- Meaghan Rath (born 1986), Canadian film and television actress
- Meaghan Rickard (born 1997), American NWHL player
- Meaghan Sargeant (born 1994), English WSL player
- Meaghan Scanlon (born 1993), Australian politician and lawyer
- Meaghan Simister (born 1986), Canadian Olympic luger
- Meaghan Sittler (born 1976), Canadian-born American NWHL player
- Meaghan Smith, Canadian singer-songwriter, musician, and visual artist
- Meaghan Volker (born 1990), Australian rower
- Meaghan Waller (born 1989), Canadian fashion model

== Megan ==
- Megan Abbott (born 1971), American author, screenwriter, and journalist
- Megan Abubo (born 1978), American professional surfer
- Megan Alatini (born 1976), South African-born, New Zealand pop singer, actress, and television personality
- Megan Alexander (born 1993), English footballer
- Megan Ambuhl (born 1974/1975), American army soldier
- Megan Amram (born 1987), American comedy writer, producer, and performer
- Megan Andelloux, American sexologist and sex educator
- Megan Anderson, several people
- Megan Angelo (born ca. 1985), American journalist and author
- Megan Anwyl (born 1962), Australian politician
- Megan Armitage (born 1996), Irish cyclist
- Megan B. Murray, American epidemiologist and an infectious disease physician
- Megan Balks, New Zealand Antarctic soil scientist
- Megan Balsdon (born 1982), Canadian curler
- Megan Baltzell (born 1993), American softball catcher
- Megan Bankes (born 1997), Canadian biathlete
- Megan Banting (born 1996), Australian cricketer
- Megan Barker (born 1997), Welsh professional racing cyclist
- Megan Barnard (born 1984), Australian sports presenter
- Megan Barry (born 1963), American businesswoman and politician
- Megan Bartlett (born 1983), American former softball player and current head coach
- Megan Barton-Hanson, English television personality
- Megan Bayne, American professional wrestler
- Megan Bell (born 2001), Northern Irish SWPL player
- Megan Belt (born 1997), English cricketer
- Megan Betsa (born 1995), American former professional softball pitcher and coach
- Megan Beveridge (born 1994/1995), Scottish soldier
- Megan Beyer (born 1957), American journalist, activist, and advocate
- Megan Blake, American actress and pet lifestyle expert
- Megan Blake Irwin (born 1992), Australian model
- Megan Blanksma, American politician
- Megan Blunk (born 1989), American wheelchair basketball player
- Megan Bonneau, American ballet dancer
- Megan Bonnell, Canadian folk musician
- Megan Bonny (born 1990), American rugby sevens player
- Megan Boone (born 1983), American actress
- Megan Boyd (1915–2001), British fly tyer
- Megan Boyle (born 1985), American writer and filmmaker
- Megan Bozek (born 1991), American CWHL-, NWHL-, and ZhHL player
- Megan Bradley (born 1983), American professional tennis player
- Megan Brennan, American politician
- Megan Brigman (born 1990), American NWSL player
- Megan Bülow (born 1999), German-Canadian pop singer
- Megan Burns (born 1986), English musician and actress
- Megan Burns (rugby union) (born 2000), Irish rugby union player
- Megan Callaway, American documentary film producer
- Megan Campbell (born 1993), Irish BWSL player
- Megan Carey, Portuguese neuroscientist
- Megan Carter (born 2001), Canadian ice hockey player
- Megan Cavanagh (actress) (born 1960), American actress
- Megan Cavanagh (judge) (born 1970/1971), American attorney
- Megan Charpentier (born 2001), Canadian actress
- Megan Chu, American rhythmic gymnast
- Megan Clark (born 1958), Australian geologist and business executive
- Megan Clarke, American cancer epidemiologist
- Megan Clarken (born 1966), New Zealand media executive and former youth athlete
- Megan Coleman (born 1985), South African beauty queen
- Megan Compain (born 1975), New Zealand basketball player
- Megan Compston (born 1980), Australian WNCL player
- Megan Connolly, several people
- Megan Cooke (born 1980), American rower
- Megan Cope (born 1982), Australian Aboriginal artist
- Megan Cornell, Canadian candidate in the 2011 Ontario provincial election
- Megan Cornish (born 1947), American socialist feminist, labor activist, and retired electrician
- Megan Cotter, American politician
- Megan Courtney (born 1993), American indoor professional volleyball player
- Megan Coy, American politician
- Megan Coyne (born 1997/1998), American political communications specialist
- Megan Craig (born 1992), New Zealand professional squash player
- Megan Crane (born c. 1973), American novelist
- Megan Crewe (born 1980), Canadian writer
- Megan Crosson (born 1994), American NWSL player
- Megan Crowhurst (born 1961), Australian- and Canadian-raised American linguist and professor
- Megan Crowson (born 1996), English field hockey player
- Megan Cunningham (born 1995), Scottish footballer
- Megan Cyr, Canadian volleyball player
- Megan Dahle (born 1975), American politician
- Megan Danso (born 1990), Canadian actress
- Megan Davies, several people
- Megan Davis (born 1975), Aboriginal Australian activist, human rights lawyer, and academic
- Megan Degenfelder (born 1988/1989), American politician
- Megan Delehanty (born 1968), Canadian rower
- Megan Devlin (born 1993), Northern Irish international lawn bowler
- Megan DiLeo (born 1996), American WNBA player
- Megan Dirkmaat (born 1976), American rower
- Megan Dodds (born 1970), American actress
- Megan Domani (born 2002), Indonesian actress
- Megan Donahue, American astronomer
- Megan Donnelly (born 1964), American field hockey player
- Megan Dorman (born 1977), Irish-born Australian actress
- Megan Dowd Lambert, American author and academic
- Megan du Boisson (1922–1969), British campaigner for disability rights
- Megan Duffy, several people
- Megan Dunn, several people
- Megan Dykeman, Canadian politician
- Megan Edwards (born 1952), American writer and editor
- Megan Elizabeth Euker, Italian and American artist and designer
- Megan Ellison (born 1986), American film producer and entrepreneur
- Megan Evans, Australian artist
- Megan Fahlenbock (born 1971), Canadian actress
- Megan Fairchild (born 1984), American ballet dancer
- Megan Falcon (born 1985), American tennis coach and former WTA player
- Megan Faraimo (born 2000), American college softball pitcher
- Megan Farrell (born 1992), Canadian snowboarder
- Megan Fearon (born 1991), British politician
- Megan Ferguson (born 1982/1983), American actress
- Megan Finnigan (born 1998), English footballer
- Megan Fisher (born 1983), Canadian-American Paralympic athlete
- Megan Fitzsimon (born 2002), Australian AFLW player
- Megan Fletcher (born 1989), English-born Irish judoka
- Megan Follows (born 1968), Canadian-American actress and director
- Megan Fonteno (born 1993), American Samoan professional swimmer
- Megan Foster (born 1992), American rugby union player
- Megan Fox (born 1986), American actress
- Megan Frazee (born 1987), American WNBA player
- Megan Frazer (born 1990), Irish women's field hockey international
- Megan Frederickson, Canadian evolutionary biologist and professor
- Megan Gaffney (born 1991), Scottish rugby union player
- Megan Gail Coles (born 1981), Canadian writer
- Megan Gailey (born 1986), American stand-up comedian, actress, and podcast host
- Megan Gaiser, American video game director and CEO
- Megan Gale (born 1975), Australian model and actress
- Megan Gallagher (born 1960), American theater- and television actress
- Megan Gallagher (handballer) (born 1963), American handball player
- Megan Ganz (born 1984), American comedy writer and former associate editor
- Megan Gebbia (born 1973), American basketball head coach
- Megan Gerety (born 1971), American alpine ski racer
- Megan Gibson-Loftin (born 1986), American former professional softball pitcher and current pitching coach
- Megan Giglia (born 1985), British Paralympic track cyclist
- Megan Gilkes (born 2000), Canadian racing driver
- Megan Glaros, American meteorologist
- Megan Godfrey (born 1983), American educator and politician
- Megan Good (born 1995), American softball pitcher
- Megan Grano (born 1977/1978), American actress and writer
- Megan Grant, American softball player
- Megan Green (born 1983), American politician and educator
- Megan Greene, American economist
- Megan Greenwell, American editor and journalist
- Megan Griffith (born 1985), American basketball coach and current head coach
- Megan Griffiths (born 1975), American film- and television director
- Megan Guarnier (born 1985), American racing cyclist
- Megan Gunnar, American child psychologist and professor
- Megan Gunning (born 1992), Canadian freestyle skier
- Megan Hall (triathlete) (born 1974), South African triathlete
- Megan Hall (poet) (born 1972), South African writer
- Megan Hanson, several people
- Megan Hanushek, American soccer player
- Megan Hart (born 1971), American author
- Megan Harvey, American voice actress
- Megan Hauserman (born 1981), American model and reality TV star
- Megan Havers (born 2007), British archer
- Megan Healy, American politician
- Megan Henning (born 1978), American actress
- Megan Henwood (born 1987), English singer-songwriter
- Megan Hickey, American member of pop/rock/alternative country band The Last Town Chorus
- Megan Hilty (born 1981), American actress and singer
- Megan Hine (born 1984), British survival consultant, adventurer, television presenter, and writer
- Megan Hodge (born 1988), American indoor volleyball player
- Megan Hollingshead (born 1968), American voice actress
- Megan Huff (born 1996), American WNBA player
- Megan Hughes (born 1977), Welsh retired track- and road racing cyclist
- Megan Hull (born 1996), New Zealand field hockey player
- Megan Hunt, several people
- Megan Hunter (born 1984), English novelist and poet
- Megan Huntsman (born 1975), American murderer
- Megan Hutton (born 1976), New Zealand retired netball player
- Megan Imrie (born 1986), Canadian biathlete
- Megan Isaacson, American Christian- and gospel pop singer
- Megan-Jane Johnstone, New Zealand-born Australian nursing scholar and contemporary artist
- Megan Jacoby (born 1991), American Hyrox athlete
- Megan Jastrab (born 2002), American professional racing cyclist
- Megan Jean (born 1983), American member of husband and wife musical duo Megan Jean and the KFB
- Megan Jendrick (born 1984), American swimmer
- Megan Jenkinson (born 1958), New Zealand photographer
- Megan Jill Russell, South African biomedical- and electrical engineer
- Megan Jones, several people
- Megan Jossa (born 1996), English actress
- Megan Joy (born 1985), American singer-songwriter
- Megan Kalajzich, Australian murder victim
- Megan Kalmoe (born 1983), American Olympic rower
- Megan Kamalei Kakimoto (born 1993), American Hawaiian author
- Megan Kanka (1986–1994), American murder victim
- Megan Kate Nelson, Pulitzer Prize finalist and historian
- Megan Kealy (born 2000), British trampoline gymnast
- Megan Keith (born 2002), Scottish athlete
- Megan Keller (born 1996), American ice hockey player
- Megan Kelso (born 1968), American comic book artist and writer
- Megan Kennedy (born 1996), Scottish rugby player
- Megan Ketch (born 1982), American actress
- Megan Khang (born 1997), American LPGA player
- Megan Khung (2015-c. 2020), Singaporean possible murder victim
- Megan Kimmel (born 1980), American sky- and mountain runner
- Megan Kiska, American military officer
- Megan Kleine (born 1974), American competition swimmer
- Megan Knight, Canadian politician
- Megan Koehler (born 1989), Canadian curler
- Megan Koester, American comedian, writer, journalist, and actress
- Megan Konar, American scientist and associate professor
- Megan Kufeld (born 1993), American USL player
- Megan Lai (born 1979), Taiwanese actress and singer
- Megan Lane (born 1991), Canadian Olympic dressage rider
- Megan Langenfeld (born 1988), American former softball pitcher and current assistant coach
- Megan Larsen (born 1962), New Zealand-born Australian-based organic skincare entrepreneur
- Megan Latham (born 1954), Australian solicitor, barrister, and judge
- Mégan Laurent (born 1992), Belgian footballer
- Megan Lawrence (born 1972), American actress
- Megan Lear (born 1951), English cricketer
- Megan Leavey (born 1983), American Marine Corps veteran and military police K9 handler
- Megan LeCrone, American ballet dancer and soloist
- Megan Lee (born 1995), Korean-American actress, director, and singer-songwriter
- Megan Lee (chess player) (born 1996), American chess player
- Megan Lee (footballer), New Zealand footballer
- Megan Leigh (1964–1990), American stripteaser and pornographic film actress
- Megan Leitch (born 1965), Canadian actress
- Megan Leslie (born 1973), Canadian politician and environmental advocate
- Megan Letter (born 1995), American YouTuber
- Megan Lindsay (born 1991), American professional soccer player
- Megan Lloyd (born 1958), American illustrator of children's books
- Megan Lloyd George (1902–1966), Welsh politician
- Megan Lotts, American academic art librarian
- Megan Lovell, American former member of acoustic music trio Lovell Sisters
- Megan Lowe (1915–2017), English cricketer
- Megan Lukan (born 1992), Canadian rugby sevens player
- Megan Lyman (born 1991), American beauty pageant titleholder
- Megan Lynn, American politician
- Megan Mace (born 1992), American member of pop duo Megan and Liz
- Megan Mahoney (born 1983), American WNBA player
- Megan Mansell (born 1990), New Zealand broadcaster
- Megan Manthey (born 1988), American USL player
- Megan Marcks (born 1972), Australian rower
- Megan Marie Hart (born 1983), American opera soprano
- Megan Marrin, American painter
- Megan Marrs (born 1997), British track and field athlete
- Megan Marsden (born 1962), American gymnastics coach and former gymnast
- Megan Marshack (born 1953), American television news writer and producer
- Megan Marshall (born 1954), American scholar, writer, and biographer
- Megan Massacre (born 1985), American tattoo artist
- Megan Maxwell (born 1965), Spanish romantic novelist
- Megan Mayhew Bergman (born 1979), American writer and environmental journalist
- Megan McArdle (born 1973), American journalist, columnist, and blogger
- Megan McAuliffe, New Zealand professor of psychology, speech and hearing
- Megan McCafferty (born 1973), American author
- Megan McCarthy (born 1966), American soccer player
- Megan McCarthy King (born 1969), American judge
- Megan McClung (1972–2006), American Marine Corps officer
- Megan McColl (born 2000), Scottish cricketer
- Megan McConnell (born 2001), American basketball player
- Megan McCormick (born 1972), American TV presenter
- Megan McCubbin (born 1995), English zoologist, conservationist, photographer, and television presenter
- Megan McDonald (born 1959), American writer
- Megan McDonnell, American screenwriter
- Megan McDowell, American literary translator
- Megan McGinnis (born 1979), American actress and singer
- Megan McInerney, Australian singer known as Meg Mac
- Megan McJames (born 1987), American alpine skier
- Megan McKay (born 1997), Australian professional basketball player
- Megan McKenna (born 1992), English television personality and singer
- Megan McKenzie (born 1980), South African model
- Megan McKinnon (born 1996), Canadian actress
- Megan E. McLaughlin, American chief executive and social worker
- Megan McNamara (born 1997), Canadian beach volleyball player
- Megan McNeil (1990–2011), Canadian singer
- Megan McTavish (born 1949), American television actress and soap opera writer
- Megan Meier (1992–2006), American suicide victim
- Megan Meza, American businesswoman and television personality
- Megan Miller, several people
- Megan Miranda, American author
- Megan Mischler (born 1989), American NWSL player
- Megan Mitchell (born 1958/1959), Australian public servant and children's advocate
- Megan Mitton (born 1986), Canadian politician
- Megan Montaner (born 1987), Spanish actress and former model
- Megan Montefusco (born 1992), American NWSL player
- Megan Moody (born 1983), British professional basketball player
- Megan Mooney (born 1974), American stand-up comedian
- Megan Megg Morales, American contestant for America's Next Top Model (season 7)
- Megan Moroney (born 1997), American country music singer
- Megan Morris, American contestant for America's Next Top Model (season 7)
- Megan Morrone (born 1973), American actress, technology podcaster, and writer
- Megan Moss (born 2002), Bahamian athlete
- Megan Moulton-Levy (born 1985), Jamaican-American professional tennis player
- Megan Mullally (born 1958), American actress
- Megan Mullins (born 1986), American country music singer, songwriter, and multi-instrumentalist
- Megan Murray New Hampshire politician
- Megan Myers (born 1992), American PWHPA player
- Megan Mylan (born 1969), American documentary filmmaker
- Megan Nash (born 1989), Canadian singer-songwriter
- Megan Neyer (born 1962), American competition springboard and platform diver
- Megan Nick (born 1996), American freestyle skier
- Megan Nicole (born 1993), American singer-songwriter and actress
- Megan Nolan (born 1990), Irish journalist and writer
- Megan Oldham (born 2001), Canadian freestyle skier
- Megan Olivi (born 1986), American mixed martial arts news/events reporter
- Megan Olson (born 1971), American painter
- Megan Oster (born 1989), American competitive figure skater
- Megan Page, several people
- Megan Park (born 1986), Canadian actress, singer, and director
- Megan Parkinson (born 1996), English actress
- Megan Parlen (born 1980), American actress
- Megan Pauwels (born 1976), Australian cricketer
- Megan Pearson, British actress
- Megan Phelps-Roper (born 1986), American political activist
- Megan Povey, English food physicist and professor
- Megan Prelinger (born 1967), American cultural historian and archivist
- Megan Prescott (born 1991), English actress and bodybuilder
- Megan Price (born 1971), American human rights activist and statistician
- Megan Pullum (born 1971), British-born Guernsey lawyer
- Megan Ranney, American practicing emergency physician and professor
- Megan Rapinoe (born 1985), American soccer player
- Megan Redmond (born 1996), American singer-songwriter
- Megan Reece, British contestant on The Voice UK (series 5)
- Megan Reid (born 1996), American NWSL player
- Megan Reinking (born 1981), American stage- and television actress
- Megan Rhodes Smith (born 1985), American softball coach
- Megan Rice (1930–2021), American nuclear disarmament activist, Catholic nun, and missionary
- Megan Richter (born 2000), British Paralympic swimmer
- Megan Rivers (born 1980), Australian field hockey player
- Megan Roberts (born 2000), Canadian artistic gymnast
- Megan Robertson (rowing), Australian rowing coxswain
- Megan Robertson (scientist), American associate professor of chemical- and biomolecular engineering
- Megan Rochell (born 1985), American contemporary R&B singer
- Megan Rohrer (born 1980), American Lutheran minister and activist
- Megan Romano (born 1991), American competition swimmer
- Megan Rooney (born 1985), Canadian-born, English-based artist
- Megan Rose, American reporter and correspondent
- Megan Rose Gedris (born 1986), American cartoonist, writer, and publisher
- Megan Rosenbloom (born 1981), American medical librarian
- Megan Rossi (born 1988), Australian dietitian, nutritionist, and author
- Megan Rule, New Zealand architect
- Megan Ryan (born 2002), Irish artistic gymnast
- Megan Rye (born 1975), American painter
- Megan Ryther (born 1979), American freestyle swimmer
- Megan Samperi (born 1993), American Playboy Playmate
- Megan Schofill, American golfer
- Megan Schutt (born 1993), Australian cricketer
- Megan Schwamb (born 1984), American astronomer, planetary scientist, and lecturer
- Megan Shackleton (born 1999), British Paralympic table tennis player
- Megan Shanahan (born 1985), Australian rugby union player
- Megan Shipman (born 1992), American voice actress
- Megan Shull (born 1968), American author
- Megan Signal (born 1990), New Zealand weightlifter
- Megan Sikora (born 1979), American actress
- Megan Sileno (born 1989), South African water polo player, and coach
- Megan Skaggs (born 1999), American artistic gymnast
- Megan Skiendiel (born 2006), American singer, dancer, and actress
- Megan Slankard (born 1983), American musician and singer-songwriter
- Megan Smallhouse (born 2001), American freestyle skier
- Megan Smart (born 1997), Australian actress
- Megan Smith (born 1964), American engineer and technologist
- Megan Smith (curler) (born 1997), Canadian curler
- Megan Smith (softball), American softball coach
- Megan Smolenyak, American genealogist, author, and speaker
- Megan Sneddon (born 1985), Scottish SWPL player
- Megan Spencer (born 1966), Australian broadcaster, film critic, journalist, media maker, and teacher
- Megan Squire, American professor of computer science
- Megan Srinivas, American politician and physician
- Megan Staffel (born 1952), American fiction writer and essayist
- Megan Stalter (born 1990), American comedian and actress
- Megan Stevenson, American actress
- Megan Sturge, English cricketer
- Megan Sullivan (born 1971), American lawyer and jurist
- Megan Suri (born 1999), American actress
- Megan Swann, British magician
- Megan Sweeney (born 1987), American luger
- Megan Sybil Baker (born 1954), American fiction writer
- Megan Sylvester (born 1994), British synchronized diver
- Megan Tandy (born 1988), Canadian biathlete
- Megan Tapper (born 1994), Jamaican athlete
- Megan Taylor (1920–1993), British figure skater
- Megan Terry (1932–2023), American playwright, screenwriter, and theater artist
- Megan Thee Stallion (born 1995), American rapper and singer-songwriter
- Megan Timothy (born 1943), Rhodesian-American actress and singer
- Megan Timpf (born 1984), Canadian softball player
- Megan Traquair (born 1962), American Anglican prelate
- Megan Twohey, American journalist
- Megan Valentine, American engineer
- Megan Valler (born 1981), Australian rugby union player
- Megan Valzonis, American field hockey player
- Megan Vaughan (born 1954), British historian and academic
- Megan Walch (born 1967), Australian contemporary painter
- Megan Walker (born 1998), American WNBA player
- Megan Walsh, several people
- Megan Ward (born 1969), American actress
- Megan Warrener (born 2003), Canadian ice hockey player
- Megan Washington (born 1986), Australian musician and songwriter
- Megan Watts Hughes (1842–1907), Welsh singer, songwriter, scientist, and philanthropist
- Megan Webb (born 2001), Welsh rugby union player
- Megan Whalen Turner (born 1965), American fantasy writer
- Megan White (born 1974), American drummer
- Megan White (cricketer) (born 1980), Australian cricketer
- Megan Whitmarsh (born 1972), American artist
- Megan Williams, several people
- Megan Wilson (born 1969), American visual artist, writer, and activist
- Megan Wing (born 1975), Canadian ice dancer
- Megan Woods (born 1973), New Zealand politician
- Megan Woodworth (born 2003), Canadian ice hockey player
- Megan Wraight (1961–2020), New Zealand landscape architect
- Megan Wright (born 1982), Canadian long-distance runner
- Megan Wynne (born 1993), Welsh professional footballer
- Megan York (born 1987), Welsh rugby union player
- Megan Young (born 1990), Filipino-American actress, model, television presenter, and beauty queen who won Miss World 2013
- Megan Zheng (born 1993), Singaporean actress and novelist

== Meggan ==
- Meggan Dawson-Farrell (born 1992), Scottish wheelchair racer
- Meggan Rollandi, New Zealand artist, performance designer, and academic
- Meggan Scavio, American businesswoman

== Meghan ==
- Meghan, Duchess of Sussex (Rachel Meghan Markle; born 1981), American former actress and member of the British Royal Family
- Meghan Addy (born 1978), American athlete
- Meghan Agosta (born 1987), Canadian ice hockey player and police officer
- Meghan Allen (born 1980), American Playboy model and reality show contestant
- Meghan Andrews (born 1979), American actress and singer
- Meghan Archer (born 1987), Australian soccer player
- Meghan Athavale, Canadian entrepreneur and toy designer
- Meghan Beaubien (born 1999), American softball pitcher
- Meghan Beesley (born 1989), English track and field athlete
- Meghan Boenig, American equestrian head coach
- Meghan Boody (born 1964), American surrealist photographer
- Meghan Camarena (born 1987), American YouTube personality, television host, actress, and comic book writer
- Meghan Chayka (born c. 1984), Canadian entrepreneur, data scientist, and ice hockey analyst
- Meghan Clyne, American journalist
- Meghan Coffey, American beauty queen
- Meghan Collison, Canadian model
- Meghan Cox (born 1994), American soccer player
- Meghan Daum (born 1970), American author, essayist, podcaster, and journalist
- Meghan Douglas (born 1970), American fashion model
- Meghan Duggan (born 1987), American former NWHL player and current director of player development
- Meghan Fardelmann, ice hockey player
- Meghan Gallacher (born 1992), British politician
- Meghan Gardler (born 1988), American basketball player who played in Europe
- Meghan Grieves (born 1994), American PWHPA player
- Meghan Hays, American communications executive
- Meghan Heffern (born 1983), Canadian actress
- Meghan Jadhav (born 1992), Indian television- and film actor
- Meghan Jaedicke (born 1997), German canoeist
- Meghan Kallman (born 1983), American politician, academic, and activist
- Meghan Kilcoyne, American politician
- Meghan King (born 1984), American reality television personality
- Meghan Klingenberg (born 1988), American soccer player
- Meghan Lenczyk (born 1989), American NWSL player
- Meghan Lino (born 1984), American wheelchair curler
- Meghan Linsey (born 1985), American singer-songwriter
- Meghan Lisenby (born 1992), American retired soccer player
- Meghan Lorence (born 1992), American PHF player
- Meghan Lukens, American politician and educator
- Meghan Maartens (born 1999), South African water polo player
- Meghan MacLaren (born 1994), English professional golfer
- Meghan McCain (born 1984), American television personality, columnist, and author
- Meghan McCarthy, American screenwriter, lyricist, film- and television producer, and creative executive
- Meghan McCool (born 1997), American NWSL player
- Meghan McPeak, Canadian WNBA broadcaster
- Meghan Montgomery (born 1981), Canadian Paralympic rower
- Meghan Murphy, Canadian writer, journalist, and podcast host
- Meghan Musnicki (born 1983), American representative rower
- Meghan O'Gieblyn, American writer and essayist
- Meghan O'Leary (born 1984), American Olympic rower
- Meghan O'Rourke (born 1976), American non-fiction writer, poet, and critic
- Meghan Ory (born 1982), Canadian television- and film actress
- Meghan O'Sullivan (born 1969), American former deputy national security adviser
- Meghan Patrick (born 1987), Canadian-American country singer-songwriter
- Meghan Picerno, American theater actress and singer
- Meghan Price, Canadian artist
- Meghan Remy (born 1985), American musician and record producer
- Meghan Roche (born 2000), American fashion model
- Meghan Schnur (born 1985), American retired soccer player
- Meghan Schroeder (born 1986), American politician
- Meghan Small (born 1998), American competitive swimmer
- Meghan Stabile (1982–2022), American jazz promoter, producer, organizer, and CEO
- Meghan Strange (born 1969), American actress
- Meghan Tierney (born 1997), American Olympian snowboarder
- Meghan Toohey, American multi-instrumentalist, songwriter, singer, producer, and performer
- Meghan Toohey (soccer) (born 1992), American soccer player
- Meghan Trainor (born 1993), American singer-songwriter
- Meghan Walter (born 2002), Canadian curler

== Meghann ==
- Meghann Burke (born 1980), American attorney and executive director of the NWSLPA
- Meghann Fahy (born 1989/1990), American actress
- Meghann Foster, American politician
- Meghann Haldeman, American actress
- Meghann Riepenhoff (born 1979), American photographer
- Meghann Shaughnessy (born 1979), American tennis player
- Meghann Treacy (born 1993), American ice hockey coach and former player

== Megyn ==
- Megyn Kelly (born 1970), American news anchor and journalist
- Megyn Price (born 1971), American actress

== Mehgan ==
- Mehgan Heaney-Grier (born 1977), American freediver, fashion model, actress, conservationist, and TV personality

== Fictional characters ==
- M3GAN, a robot prototype from a Universal Pictures horror movie
- Megan, a female background character that appears in the Recess franchise
- Meggan (character), a comic book superhero appearing in books published by Marvel Comics
- Megan "Meg" Abbott, a character in The Leftovers, portrayed by Liv Tyler
- Megan Adams, a character in the Australian television series Upright
- Meagan Aylward and Megan Hounsell, characters in the 2011 film Cyberbully
- Megan Bloomfield, the protagonist of the movie But I'm a Cheerleader
- Megan Buchanan, a character in One Life to Live
- Megan Carter, a character in the film Absence of Malice
- Megan Cervantes, a character from the 2012 Philippine television drama fantasy series Aryana
- Megan Clark, a character in The Amazing Spiez
- Meghann "Meggie" Cleary, the central character in The Thorn Birds
- Megan Conley, a character in The Bold and the Beautiful, portrayed by Maeve Quinlan
- Megan Craig Riley, a character in One Life to Live
- Megan Donner, a character in CSI: Miami, portrayed by Kim Delaney
- Megan Draper, a character in the television series Mad Men
- Dr. Megan Eisenberg, a character in the film Father of the Bride Part II
- Megan "Meg" Griffin, a character in the television series Family Guy
- Pixie (Megan Gwynn), a comic book superhero appearing in books published by Marvel Comics
- Megan Halari, a character from the 2026 Philippine musical drama Born to Shine
- Megan Harries, owner of Cwmderi's chapel, Bethania, in the Welsh soap Pobol y Cwm
- Megan Macey, a character in the television series Emmerdale
- Megan Parker, a character in the television series Drake & Josh
- Megan Reed, a neuroscientist appearing in the video game Deus Ex: Human Revolution and Deus Ex: Mankind Divided
- Megan Sharma, a character in Doctors, portrayed by Ritu Arya
- Megan Sparkles, a character in the television series Sanjay and Craig
- Megan the Monday Fairy, a character from the Rainbow Magic book franchise
- Megan Voorhees, a minor character in Scary Movie 2
- Megan Wheeler, a character in Law & Order: Criminal Intent, portrayed by Julianne Nicholson
- Megan Williams, a character from the TV series My Little Pony

== See also ==
- Mehigan, an Irish language surname that has the variants Megan, Meaghan and Meighan
