= Povey =

Povey is a surname of medieval English origin.

== Notable people with this surname include ==
- Arthur Povey (1886–1946), English cricketer
- Daniel Povey, British speech recognition researcher
- Guy Povey (born 1960), British racing driver
- Jeff Povey, British screenwriter and novelist
- John Povey (1621–1679), English-born judge in Ireland
- Justinian Povey (d. 1652), English administrator
- Megan Povey (died 2026), English food physicist
- Meic Povey (1950–2017), Welsh playwright and screenwriter
- Thomas Povey (1613/14 – c.1705), English landowner, trader and politician
- William Povey (born 1943), English professional footballer
