= Wonder Works (disambiguation) =

Wonder Works is a children's museum in Oak Park, Illinois.

Wonder Works or WonderWorks may also refer to:

- WonderWorks, a PBS children's TV show
- WonderWorks (museum), a series of family entertainment centers in the USA
- Wonder Works, a video game studio founded by YouTuber Megan Letter

== See also ==
- Wonder Workshop, an American education and robotics company
- Wonderworking, the working of magic or miracles
