= Pullum =

Pullum is a surname. Notable people with the surname include:

- Geoffrey K. Pullum (born 1945), British-American linguist
- Joe Pullum (1905–1964), American blues singer-songwriter
- Megan Pullum (born 1971), British lawyer
- William Pullum (1887–1968), English physical culturist, strongman, and weightlifter
