= Pauwels =

Pauwels is a Flemish patronymic surname derived from the personal name Pauwel, a vernacular form of Paul. Notable people with the name include:

== Surname ==
- Désiré Pauwels (1864–1894), Belgian anarchist
- Eddy Pauwels (1935–2017), Belgian racing cyclist
- Emiel Pauwels (1918–2014), Belgian track and field athlete
- Emmanuel Pauwels (1903–?), Belgian competitive sailor
- Ferdinand Pauwels (1830–1904), Belgian history painter in Germany
- Fleur Pauwels (born 2003), Belgian footballer
- Frans Pauwels (1918–2001), Dutch racing cyclist
- Friedrich Pauwels (1885–1980), German (Aachen) orthopedist known for Pauwel's angle
- Isabelle Pauwels (born 1950), Belgian-born Canadian video artist
- Ivo Pauwels (born 1950), Belgian author
- Jeanne-Catherine Pauwels (1795–1889), Belgian musician
- José Pauwels (1928–2012), Belgian racing cyclist
- Katrien Pauwels (born 1965), Belgian figure skater
- Kevin Pauwels (born 1984), Belgian racing cyclist
- Kobe Pauwels (born 2004), Belgian racing driver
- Louis Pauwels (1920–1997), Belgian-French journalist and writer
- Luc Pauwels (born 1940), Belgian political scientist
- Marie-Claire Pauwels (1945–2011), French journalist
- Megan Pauwels (born 1976), Australian cricketer
- Peter-Frans Pauwels (born 1965), Dutch entrepreneur
- Rudi Pauwels (born 1960), Belgian pharmacologist
- Sabine Pauwels (born 1966), Belgian swimmer
- Serge Pauwels (born 1983), Belgian road bicycle racer
- Thierry Pauwels (born 1957), Belgian astronomer
  - 12761 Pauwels, main belt asteroid named after him

== Given name ==
- Pauwels Franck (c.1540–1596), Flemish landscape painter
- Pauwels van Hillegaert (1596–1640), Dutch painter
