= Neil McKenzie =

South African cricketer

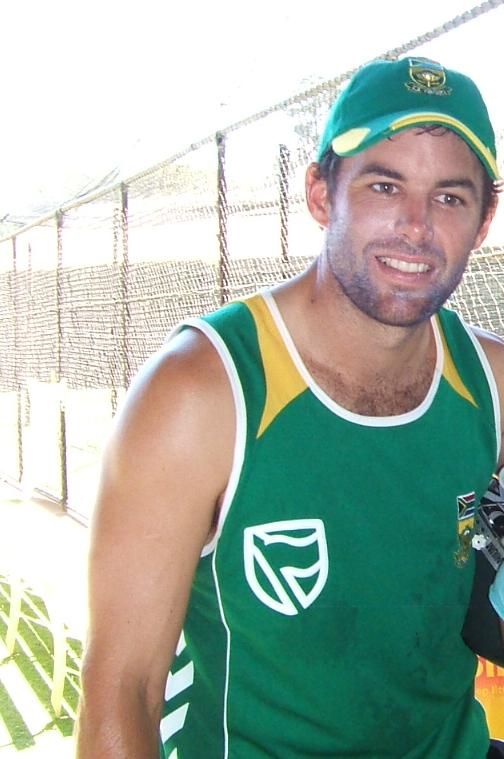

Personal information
- Full name: Neil Douglas McKenzie
- Born: 24 November 1975 (age 50); Johannesburg, Transvaal Province, South Africa
- Batting: Right-handed
- Bowling: Right-arm medium
- Relatives: Kevin McKenzie (father), Megan McKenzie (sister)

International information
- National side: South Africa (2000–2009)
- Test debut (cap 277): 20 July 2000 v Sri Lanka
- Last Test: 6 March 2009 v Australia
- ODI debut (cap 59): 2 February 2000 v Zimbabwe
- Last ODI: 30 January 2009 v Australia
- ODI shirt no.: 4
- T20I debut (cap 21): 24 February 2006 v Australia
- Last T20I: 13 January 2009 v Australia

Domestic team information
- Years: Team
- 1995/96–1996/97: Transvaal
- 1997/98–1998/99: Gauteng
- 1999/00–2003/04: Northerns
- 2003/04–2015/16: Lions
- 2007: Somerset
- 2008: Durham
- 2010–2013: Hampshire
- 2014: Barbados Tridents

Career statistics
Competition	Test	ODI	FC	LA
Matches	58	64	280	298
Runs scored	3,253	1,688	19,041	8,571
Batting average	37.39	37.51	45.77	37.92
100s/50s	5/16	2/10	53/86	12/58
Top score	226	131*	237	131*
Balls bowled	90	46	1,054	255
Wickets	0	0	11	4
Bowling average	–	–	51.63	62.00
5 wickets in innings	0	0	0	0
10 wickets in match	0	0	0	0
Best bowling	–	–	2/13	2/19
Catches/stumpings	54/–	21/–	255/–	90/–
- Source: ESPNcricinfo, 2 December 2021

Neil Douglas McKenzie (born 24 November 1975) is a South African former cricketer, who played all three forms of the game. He was a right-handed opening batsman who played for South Africa, making his first appearance in 2000. He is currently the high performance batting coach of South Africa. He played for the Highveld Lions in South African domestic cricket and has also played county cricket for Somerset, Durham and Hampshire.

He announced his retirement from all forms of cricket in January 2016.

In November 2024, he was appointed as the consultant coach for the Sri Lanka national cricket team for the upcoming 2-match test series against South Africa national cricket team.

== Early and personal life ==
Educated at King Edward VII School, McKenzie was a promising junior cricketer, captaining the South African Schools and Under-19 sides. McKenzie is married to South African model Kerry McGregor. His sister, Megan, is also a leading model in South Africa.

== Domestic career ==
With better form in international arena, a further development as a result of his recall was that Somerset announced that it was unlikely that McKenzie would return to the club for the 2008 season, having played in 2007 as a Kolpak player. It was subsequently announced that he would play part of the 2008 season for Durham as an overseas player.

In January 2010, McKenzie joined English county side Hampshire as a Kolpak player for the 2010 County Championship. On 5 August 2011 McKenzie hit his career best first-class score of 237 in a County Championship match against Yorkshire. Not only did he make his highest score, but during his innings a number of records fell. He and Michael Carberry set a new Hampshire record for the 3rd wicket in first-class cricket, setting a partnership of 523 runs to surpass the previous best partnership for the 3rd wicket, which was set by George Brown and Phil Mead in 1927. The partnership with Carberry was also the highest for any wicket for Hampshire, surpassing the 411 set by Robert Poore and Teddy Wynyard in 1899. Their partnership was the 11th time in first-class cricket that a partnership has passed 500 runs, currently ranks 9th on the all-time list.

== International career ==
His Test debut came as an opening batsman in a tour of Sri Lanka but like his father Kevin McKenzie he soon cemented his place in the South African middle order before returning to the side as an opener later in his career. McKenzie made his maiden Test hundred against New Zealand in 2000–01. Another century soon came, against Sri Lanka at Supersport Park but it would be his last for seven years. From there on in he could not convert his twelve 50s into hundreds although he came close when he was run out by Damien Martyn for 99. After a series of low scores was dropped from the side. After showing excellent form in domestic cricket, and due to successive poor performances by opener Herschelle Gibbs, he was recalled to the South African Test squad three and a half years later for the second Test against the West Indies at Newlands. Opening the innings, McKenzie scored 23 before a torn calf muscle meant he was unable to bat in the second innings and would miss the third Test of the series.

During a test against Bangladesh begun on 29 February 2008, McKenzie was involved in a world record 1st wicket partnership of 415 with Graeme Smith, McKenzie registering a career best 226. He continued his form in the next Test against India when he registered scores of 94 and 155 not out.

In the first Test against England at Lord's in July 2008, McKenzie batted for over nine hours in a 447-ball innings of 138 to help his side save the match having been asked to follow-on on the third day.

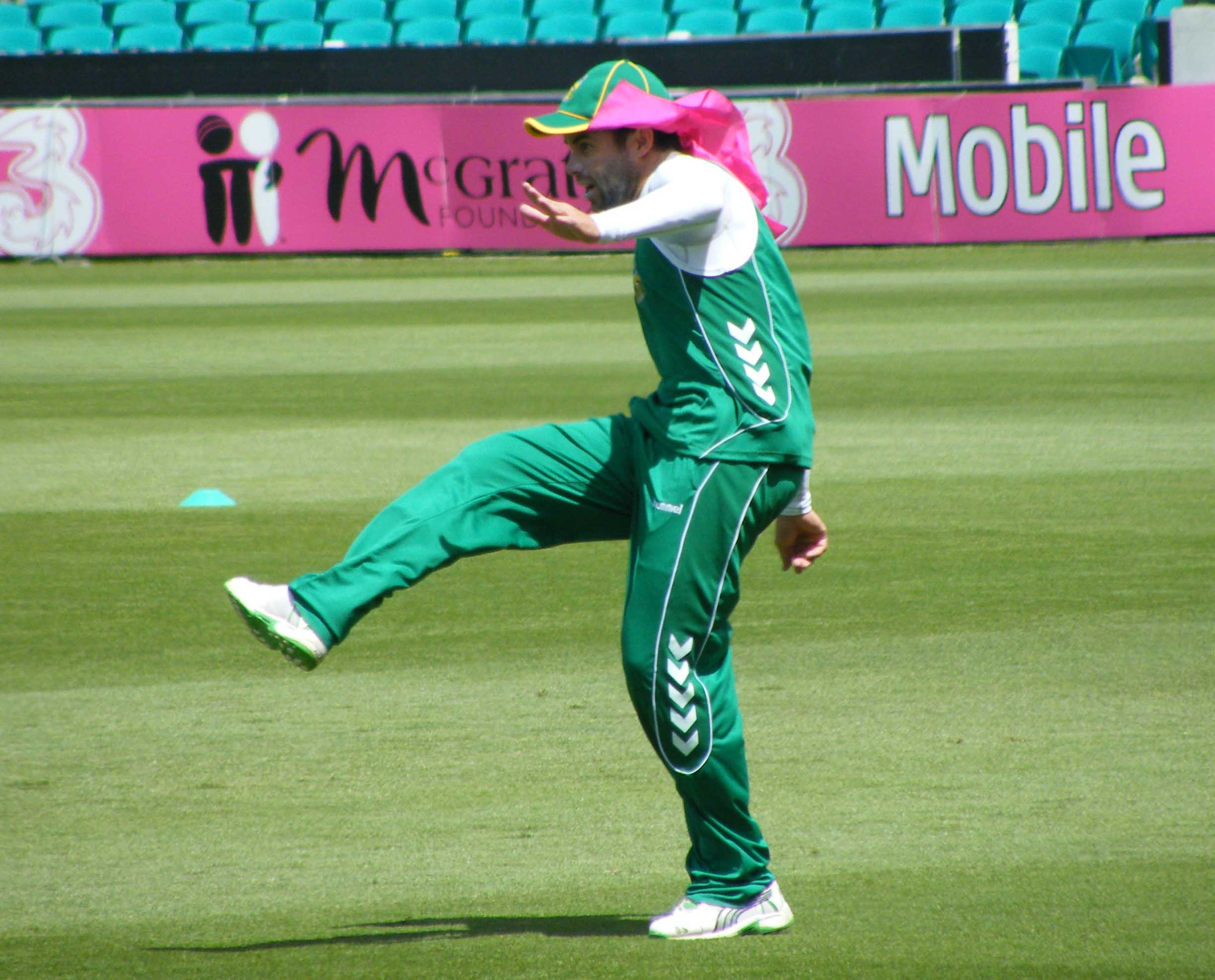
Neil McKenzie training at the Sydney Cricket Ground in January 2009

During 2008, McKenzie became one of only twelve players to score more than 1000 test runs in the calendar year. The year, however, ended in disappointing fashion as he was shown to be out of form in series against Bangladesh and Australia. That then led to him being dropped from the test squad, after the second test.

He played his first ODI since 2003 against Australia and made a hard-fought 63 in the first ODI, while also playing his part in a successful 4–1 series win, which made South Africa the number 1 ranked ODI team in the world. With Graeme Smith fit again, McKenzie lost his place in the next ODI squad.

He was however named as one of five cricketers of the year by Wisden, a prestigious award, dating back more than 125 years, for his form in the away series in England.

== International centuries ==
=== Test centuries ===
Test centuries of Neil McKenzie
No	Runs	Match	Against	City/Country	Venue	Start date	Result
[1]	120	5	New Zealand	Port Elizabeth, South Africa	St George's Park	30 November 2000	Won
[2]	103	9	Sri Lanka	Centurion, South Africa	SuperSport Park	20 January 2001	Won
[3]	226	44	Bangladesh	Chittagong, Bangladesh	ZAC Stadium	29 February 2008	Won
[4]	155*	45	India	Chennai, India	MA Chidambaram Stadium	26 March 2008	Drawn
[5]	138	48	England	London, England	Lord's	10 July 2008	Drawn

=== ODI centuries ===
One Day International centuries of Neil McKenzie
No	Runs	Match	Against	City/Country	Venue	Date	Result
[1]	120*	19	Sri Lanka	East London, South Africa	Buffalo Park	17 December 2000	Won
[2]	131*	35	Kenya	Cape Town, South Africa	Newlands Cricket Ground	22 October 2001	Won

== International awards ==
=== One Day International Cricket ===
==== Man of the Match awards ====
S No	Opponent	Venue	Date	Match performance	Result
1	Sri Lanka	Buffalo Park, East London	17 December 2000	120* (135 balls: 13x4, 1x6); 1-0-5-0	South Africa won by 95 runs.
2	West Indies	Queen's Park Oval, Port of Spain	12 May 2001	73 (117 balls: 8x4); DNB	South Africa won by 53 runs.
3	Zimbabwe	Harare Sports Club, Harare	30 September 2001	69* (86 balls: 10x4)	South Africa won by 6 wickets.
4	Kenya	Newlands Cricket Ground, Cape Town	22 October 2001	131* (121 balls: 8x4, 3x6); 2-0-10-0	South Africa won by 208 runs.
5	India	Bangabandhu National Stadium, Dhaka	18 April 2003	1 ct.; 80 (107 balls: 6x4)	South Africa won by 5 wickets.
