= Hailey Harbison =

American soccer player (born 1996)

Hailey Hinkley
Personal information
- Birth name: Hailey Linda Harbison
- Date of birth: October 3, 1996 (age 30)
- Place of birth: San Diego, California, U.S.
- Height: 5 ft 4 in (1.63 m)
- Positions: Defender; forward

Youth career
- DMCV Sharks

College career
Years	Team	Apps	(Gls)
2014–2018	Pepperdine Waves		

Senior career*
Years	Team	Apps	(Gls)
2019–2021	North Carolina Courage	0	(0)
- * Club domestic league appearances and goals

Hailey Hinkley (née Harbison; born October 3, 1996) is an American professional soccer player who plays as a defender.

== Early life ==
Hinkley was born in San Diego, California and raised in the Rancho Peñasquitos neighborhood. She played for the DMCV Sharks in her childhood.

== Club career ==
Hinkley made her NWSL debut on September 12, 2020.

== Personal life ==
Hinkley's older sister, Meagan Harbison, is also a soccer player and is a member of the Dominican Republic women's national team. She is of Irish descent through her father, while her mother is Afro-Dominican.
