= Road trip =

Long-distance journey on the road

A road trip is a long-distance journey traveled by a car or motorcycle. They are typically done for recreation, but can also be undertaken for work travel or to visit relatives and friends.

I'm gonna leave the city, got to get away

All this fussin' and fightin', man, you know I sure can't stay

Now, baby, pack your leavin' trunk, you know we've got to leave today

— Canned Heat, "Going Up the Country"

A road trip can either be planned or done through spontaneous free will. During the Great Depression, road trips and nomadic lifestyles were often undertaken to escape the effects of the Dust Bowl, as noted in John Steinbeck's The Grapes of Wrath (1939). In the mid-to-late 20th century, road trips became a topic of recreation as opposed to economic necessity, as portrayed in the Harold Ramis film National Lampoon's Vacation (1983). Road trips have also been associated with cultural movements and hitchhiking, such as in the case of bohemian hippies, music festivals, and the counterculture of the 1960s.

== History ==
=== First road trips by automobile ===
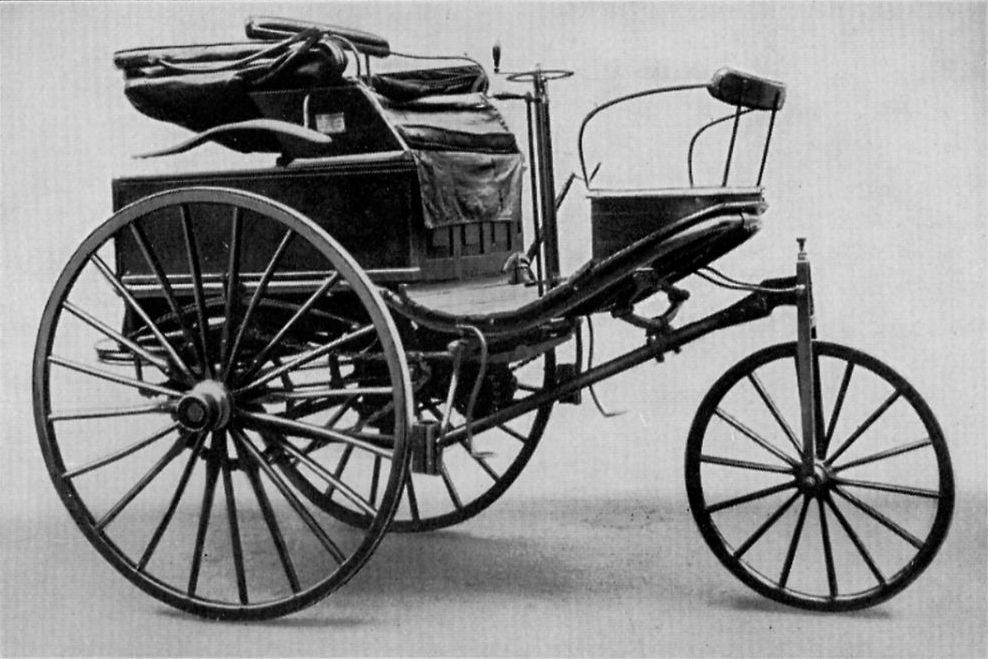
The Benz Patent-Motorwagen Number 3 of 1888, used by Bertha Benz for the highly publicized first long-distance road trip by automobile (of over 106 km / 60 miles)

The world's first recorded long-distance road trip by the automobile took place in Germany in August 1888 in the third experimental Benz Patent-Motorwagen. Bertha Benz, the wife of the car's inventor Karl Benz, traveled 106 km (66 mi) from Mannheim to Pforzheim with her two teenage sons, Richard and Eugen. The vehicle had a maximum speed of 10 kilometres per hour (6.2 mph), and the trip took over twelve hours. The vehicle had only been used on short test drives before, and Bertha did not tell her husband about her plans. The official reason for the trip was to visit her mother; in reality, she intended to generate publicity for her husband's invention. The Benz family business would eventually evolve into the present-day Mercedes-Benz company. The route she drove is now a designated scenic route in Baden-Württemberg called the Bertha Benz Memorial Route.

=== Early road trips in North America ===
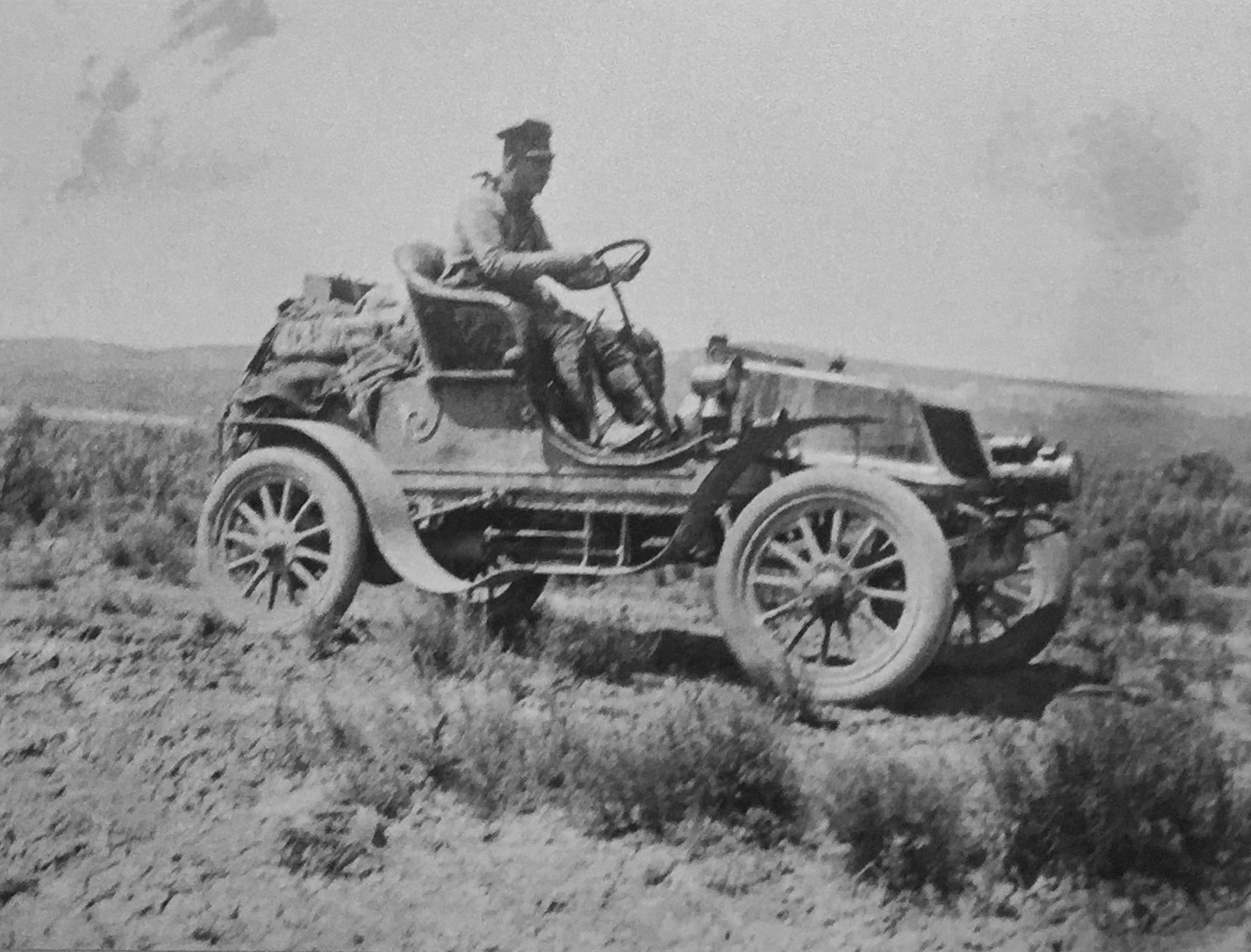
Jackson driving the Vermont on the 1903 Route 83 cross-country drive

The first successful North American transcontinental trip by automobile took place in 1903 and was piloted by H. Nelson Jackson and Sewall K. Crocker, accompanied by a dog named Bud. The trip was completed using a 1903 Winton Touring Car, dubbed "Vermont" by Jackson. The trip took 63 days between San Francisco and New York, costing US$8,000. The total cost included items such as food, gasoline, lodging, tires, parts, other supplies, and the cost of the Winton.

The Ocean to Ocean Automobile Endurance Contest was a road trip from New York City to Seattle in June, 1909. The winning car took 23 days to complete the trip.

The first woman to cross the American landscape by car was Alice Huyler Ramsey with three female passengers in 1909. Ramsey left from Hell's Gate in Manhattan, New York and traveled 59 days to San Francisco, California. Ramsey was followed in 1910 by Blanche Stuart Scott, who is often mistakenly cited as the first woman to make the cross-country journey by automobile East-to-West (but was a true pioneer in aviation).

Widely publicized summer road trips by Henry Ford, Thomas Edison, and Harvey Firestone popularized to Americans the idea of driving a car to a new and faraway place rather than for frequent in-town destinations like work, church, friends, and family. The trips also sometimes included naturalist John Burroughs and presidents of the United States Warren Harding, Calvin Coolidge, and Herbert Hoover.

The 1919 Motor Transport Corps convoy was a road trip by approximately 300 United States Army personnel from Washington, DC to San Francisco. Dwight Eisenhower was a participant. 81 vehicles began the trip which took 62 days to complete, overcoming numerous mechanical and road condition problems. Eisenhower's report about this trip led to an understanding that improving cross-country highways was important to national security and economic development.

=== Expansion of highways in the United States ===
Location of U.S. Route 66

New highways in the early 20th century helped propel automobile travel in the United States, primarily cross-country. Commissioned in 1926 and completely paved near the end of the 1930s, U.S. Route 66 is a living icon of early modern road-tripping.

Motorists ventured cross-country for holidays as well as migrating to California and other locations. The modern American road trip began to take shape in the late 1930s and into the 1940s, ushering in an era of a nation on the move.

As a result of this new vacation-by-road style, many businesses began to cater to road-weary travelers. More reliable vehicles and services made long-distance road trips easier for families, as the length of time required to cross the continent was reduced from months to days. The average family can travel to destinations across North America in one week. For example, Maryland journalist Kevin James Shay drove his two kids, Preston and McKenna, across the United States and back in roughly two weeks in 2013, visiting the Grand Canyon, Mount Rushmore, and other top attractions during the 6,950-mile trip.

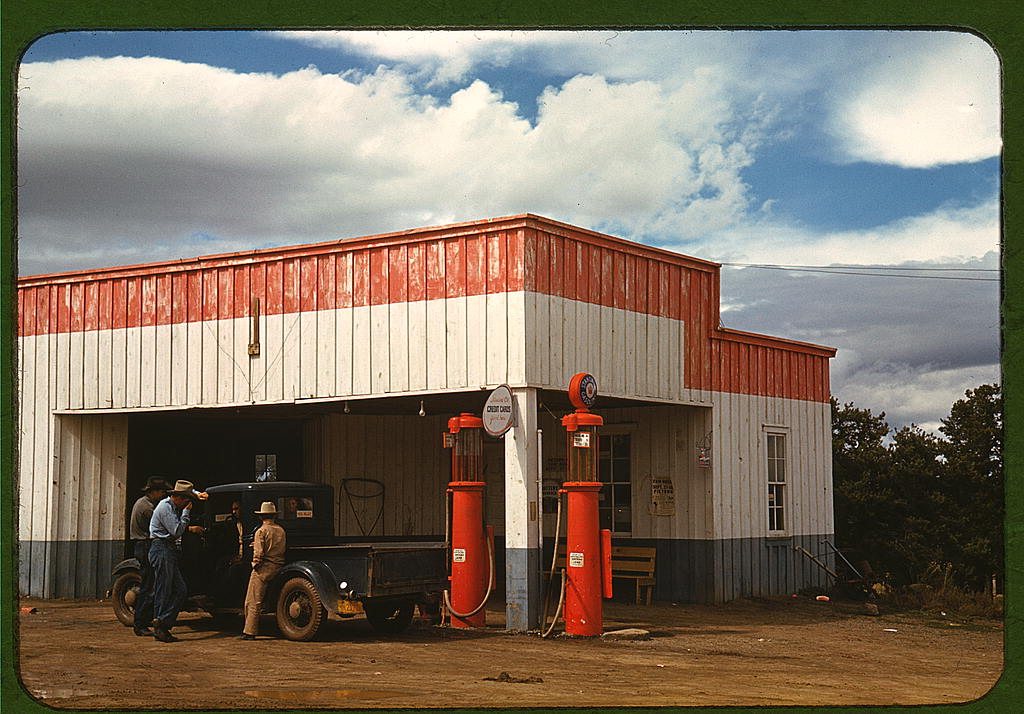
Pie Town gas station and garage in 1940

The 1950s saw the rapid growth of ownership of automobiles by American families. The automobile, now a trusted mode of transportation, was being widely used for not only commuting but leisure trips as well. The biggest change to the American road trip was the start and subsequent expansion of the Interstate Highway System. The higher speeds and controlled access nature of the Interstate allowed for greater distances to be traveled in less time and with improved safety as highways became divided.

Travelers from European countries, Australia, and elsewhere soon came to the United States to take part in the American ideal of a road trip. Canadians also engaged in road trips taking advantage of the large size of their nation and close proximity to destinations in the United States.

Some took to the road for years. After their home in Pasadena, California, was destroyed in a wildfire in 1993, Megan Edwards and Mark Sedenquist lived in a custom-built motorhome they called the Phoenix One for six years. They later settled in Las Vegas and started a website, RoadTripAmerica.com, to network with other road-trip advocates.

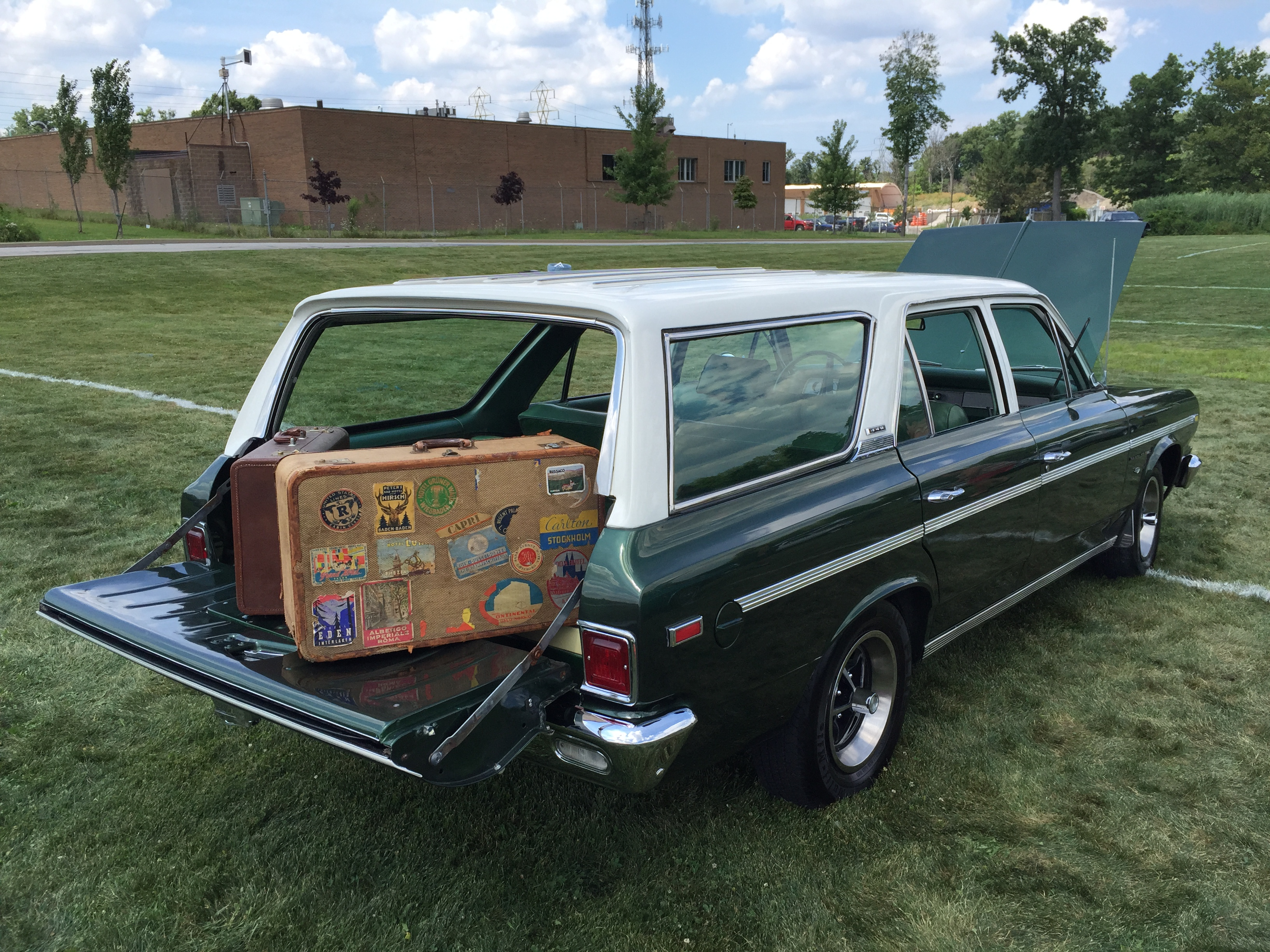
A 1969 AMC Rambler Wagon with luggage in the rear. Station wagons (also known as estate cars in Europe) became notable family vehicles for road trips in the United States and Canada in the 20th century.

Others began to see how fast they could reach all 48 states in the contiguous United States. Texas insurance agent Jay Lowe and two associates set the record in 1994 of just under five days, and they were mentioned in the Guinness Book of Records. After others beat that time, Lowe and his partners again eclipsed the record in 2019, driving 6,619 miles through the 48 states in just under four days.

== Possible motivations ==
Many people may go on road trips for recreational purpose (e.g. sightseeing or to reach a desired location, typically during a vacation period; e.g., in the US, driving to Disneyland from Oregon). Other motivations for long-distance travel by automobile include visitation of friends and relatives, who may live far away, or relocation of one's permanent living space.

In a January 2022 survey conducted by OnePoll, 2,000 American drivers were polled. The results revealed that, on average, individuals have embarked on approximately seven road trips throughout their lives. Over 78% of Americans have reported discovering special destinations such as restaurants (46%), historic locations (40%), and roadside attractions (38%), during their journeys that might have gone unnoticed if they had chosen an alternative mode of travel. Respondents also highlighted the additional benefits of road tripping, such as quality bonding time with family and friends (51%), the flexibility to make stops (48%), and the financial savings associated with this more economical method of travel (46%).

== In popular culture ==
Literature

- Bill Bryson, The Lost Continent: Travels in Small-Town America (1989)
- F. Scott Fitzgerald, The Cruise of the Rolling Junk (1924)
- Victor H. Green published annually The Negro Motorist Green Book (also referred to as The Negro Traveler's Green Book or simply as The Green Book)
- William Least Heat-Moon, Blue Highways (1982)
- Jack Kerouac, On the Road (1957)
- Vladimir Nabokov, Lolita (1955)
- Mary Roberts Rinehart, Through Glacier Park in 1915 / Seeing America first with Howard Eaton (With Illustrations)
- John Steinbeck, Travels With Charley: In Search of America (1961)
- Hunter S. Thompson, Fear and Loathing in Las Vegas: A Savage Journey to the Heart of the American Dream (1971), a roman à clef, rooted in autobiographical incidents
- Mark Twain, Roughing It (1872)

Photography

- In The Open Road: Photography & the American Road Trip (2014), the photography writer David Campany introduces the photographic road trip as a genre, the first book to do so.
- Robert Frank, The Americans (1958) – Sean O'Hagan, writing in The Guardian, about the inclusion of The Americans as the starting point in Campany's The Open Road: Photography & the American Road Trip, said "Swiss-born Frank set out with his Guggenheim Grant to do something new and unconstrained by commercial diktat. He aimed to photograph America as it unfolded before his somewhat sombre outsider’s eye.
- Ed Ruscha, Twentysix Gasoline Stations (1963)
- Stephen Shore, Uncommon Places (1982) and American Surfaces (1999)

Films

Many movies and other forms of media have been made that focus on the topic of road trips, including the namesake. Many tend to be comedic, although road movies such as Easy Rider and Thelma and Louise exemplify the American dream.

- Easy Rider (1969), an American road movie
- National Lampoon's Vacation (1983-2015), a comedy film series initially based on filmmaker/writer John Hughes' short story "Vacation '58", that was originally published by National Lampoon magazine. The series is distributed by Warner Bros, and consists of seven films.
- Planes, Trains and Automobiles (1987), an American comedy-drama film
- Thelma & Louise (1991), an American crime drama film
- Road Trip (2000), an American road comedy film
- RV (2006), an American road comedy film
- The Bucket List (2007), a comedy-drama film
- The Fundamentals of Caring (2016), a comedy-drama film

Music

- "America" by Simon & Garfunkel
- "Born to Be Wild" by Steppenwolf
- "Born to Run" by Bruce Springsteen
- "Have Love Will Travel" by The Sonics
- "Here I Go Again" by Whitesnake
- "Going Up the Country" by Canned Heat
- "Graceland" by Paul Simon
- "Life is a Highway" by Tom Cochrane
- "On the Road Again" by Willie Nelson
- "Radar Love" by Golden Earring
- "Rip This Joint" by The Rolling Stones
- "Roadhouse Blues" by The Doors
- "Roadtrip" by Dream
- "Road Trippin'" by Red Hot Chili Peppers
- "Route 66", a popular rhythm and blues song about the cities and towns through which U.S. Route 66 passes. Since it was released, it has been recorded by many musical artists, such as Aerosmith, Bing Crosby, Chuck Berry, Them, Asleep at the Wheel, and Depeche Mode.
- "Take it Easy" by The Eagles / Jackson Browne
- "Truckin'" by The Grateful Dead, recognized by the United States Library of Congress in 1997 as a national treasure.

=== Tourism ===
- 2023 Accra-London road trip

== See also ==
- Bicycle touring
- Driving
- Grand Tour
- List of roads and highways
- List of longest highways
- Road trip games
