= 2023 Accra-London road trip =

Road trip from Accra to London

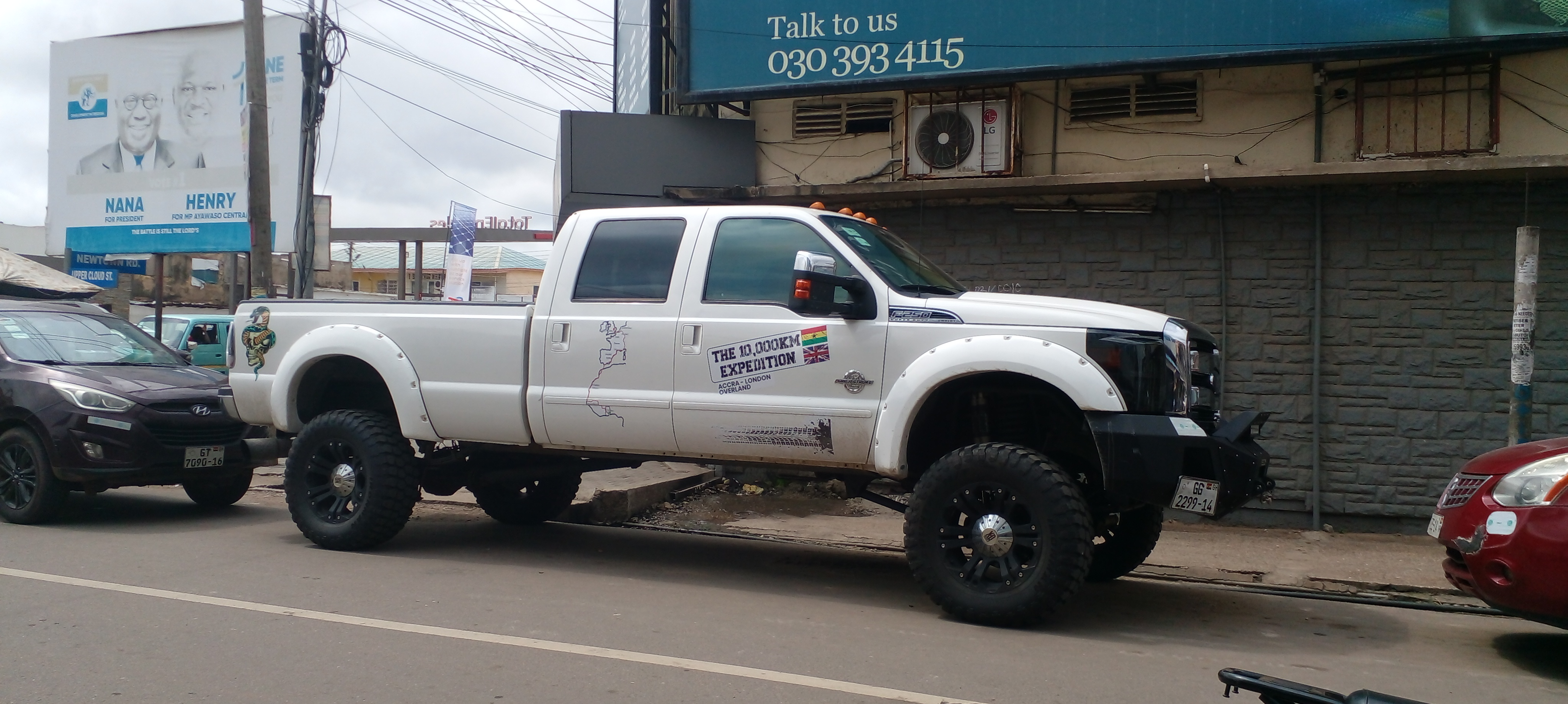
One of the vehicles used during the road trip

Accra to London road trip was a trip organized by Wanderlust Ghana (also known as The Wonderlancers), a group of philanthropists and tourists. The journey was about 10,000 km from Accra in Ghana to London in the UK by road. They are the first Ghanaians to embark on this trip.

== Background ==
On 23 July 2023, a group of 12 Ghanaians began an expedition to drive from Africa to Europe. They started the journey with five cars with Ghanaian registration namely Ford F-250; two Toyota Landcruisers (V8), Mercedez Benz G-Wagon and Lexus RX 350. The participants of the trip were Franklin Peters and his son Quincy; Kwame Peprah, Kwadwo Saka, Kofi Peprah, Kwadwo Prakah-Asante, Richard Anim, Kwabena Ayirebi and his brother Kojo; Cyprian Ed, and the only female Nana Afua Serwaa Adusei (also known as Shecanic).

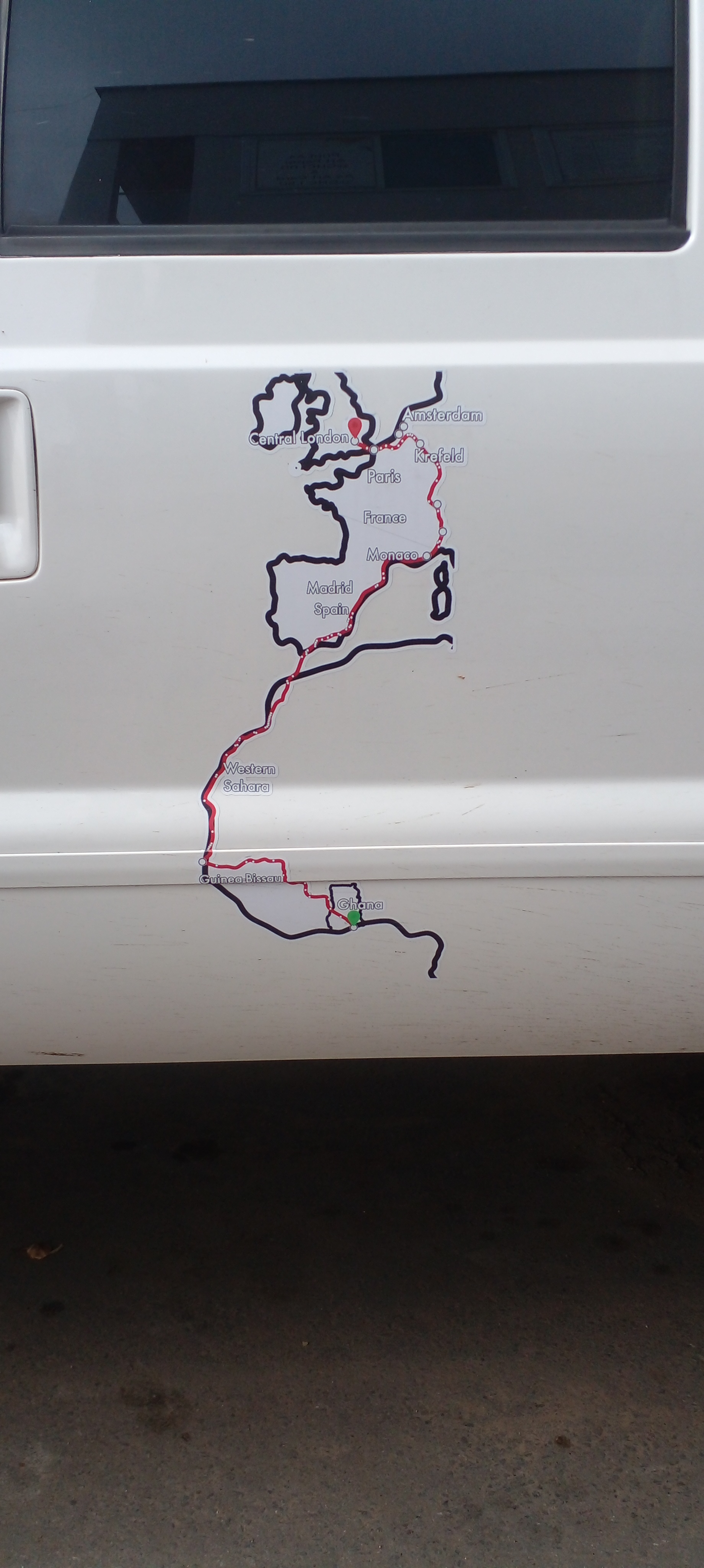
The route

=== Africa ===
They started the journey from Oyarifa, a suburb of Accra through Aburi, Nsawam, Kumasi, and Sunyani to Dormaa and finally entered Ivory Coast via Golokrom. They moved through five countries namely Ivory Coast, Mali, Senegal where they were invited by El Hadji Diouf for lunch, Mauritania and Morocco where they spent three days.

=== Europe ===
They entered in Europe through a ferry on the Mediterranean to Algeciras in Spain. They drove to Barcelona through Valencia. On 4 August 2023, they arrived in Monaco in France, to Lucomo (Lake Como), to Switzerland where they were hosted by Dr. Victor Bampoe, then to Frankfurt in Germany and then to Amsterdam in the Netherlands.

== Arrival to London ==
On 6 August 2023, they arrived in London at about 12:00pm GMT (1:00 pm BST). Out of the 12 people who started the journey, only 9 people made it to London.

== Philanthropy ==
The journey was made to raise funds for primary schools in the rural areas of Ghana through EduSports, a philanthropy organization, which creates educational hotspots for schools in deprived areas.

== Aftermath ==
The group planned to embark on another trip from Accra to Cape Town in South Africa in 2024.

=== Comments by media personalities ===
Saddick Adams, a Ghanaian sports journalist said “dis na thrilling adventure. Na im wish say he fit document di way di group dey document dia 10,000km trip” which means this is a thrilling adventure. He wishes he could document the way the group documented their 10,000 km trip.

Gary Al-Smith, also a Ghanaian sports journalist said “feeling say dis adventure go end plus fantastic twist” which means he has a feeling this adventure would end with fantastic twist.

Ben Dotsei Malor, a former BBC editor and current chief editor at UN News, said “dis na amazing, awesome, daring den beautiful adventure” which means this is an amazing, awesome, daring and beautiful adventure.

==== Other comments ====
Ruth Dwira said “di explorers get moni to spare dat be why dem dey spend am anyhow” which means the explorers are wealthy that was why they spend anyhow and also “na irrelevant trip plus no inspiration” which means this was an irrelevant trip with no inspiration.

== See also ==
- Road trip
- Driving
