= Wire Waltz =

Studio album by The Last Town Chorus
- Released: October 2, 2006
- Recorded: 2004–2006
- Genre: Indie
- Length: 37:47
- Labels: Hacktone Records (US); Loose Music (UK)
- Producer: Megan Hickey

The Last Town Chorus chronology
The Last Town Chorus (2003)	Wire Waltz (2006)

Professional ratings
Review scores
Source	Rating
Pitchfork Media	6.2/10 stars
AllMusic	3.5/5 stars
PopMatters	8/10 stars
All Things Considered	

Wire Waltz is the second album from band The Last Town Chorus, released in 2006, three years after their eponymous debut. It contains the band's most well known track, a cover of David Bowie's "Modern Love", also featured in a season two episode of Grey's Anatomy.

By the time the album was recorded, former member Nat Guy had departed the band.

== Track listing ==
All tracks are written by Megan Hickey, except as noted.

No.	Title	Length
1.	"Wire Waltz"	2:43
2.	"You"	3:09
3.	"Modern Love" (David Bowie)	4:26
4.	"Caroline"	3:10
5.	"It's Not Over"	4:25
6.	"Understanding"	3:30
7.	"Boat"	3:11
8.	"Huntsville, 1989"	4:29
9.	"Wintering in Brooklyn"	4:31
10.	"Foreign Land"	3:31
11.	"Wire Waltz (Reprise)" (Hidden Track)	0:36

== Singles ==
"Modern Love" was released as the only single from the album. It was released on 7" vinyl in the UK with "Wintering In Brooklyn" as a B-side.

== Personnel ==
All tracks written and produced by Megan Hickey, except as noted. Hickey performs Lap Steel Guitar and Vocals on all tracks. Other personnel as noted below.

"Wire Waltz"

- Percussion: Mark Fredericks & Alan Bezozi
- Bass: Ken Heitmeuller
- Hammond Organ & Piano: Joe McGinty
- Violin: Maxim Moston
- Guitar: Pete Galub

"You"

- Guitar: Pete Galub
- Percussion: Alan Bezozi
- Harmony Vocals: Amy Allison

"Modern Love"

- Written by David Bowie
- Guitar: Pete Galub
- Percussion: Alan Bezozi
- Electric Piano & Vocals: Greta Gertler
- Bass: Bryon Isaccs

"Caroline"

- Guitar: Pete Galub
- Percussion: Alan Bezozi
- Bass: Bryon Issacs
- Bark: Sailer

"It's Not Over"

- Guitar: Pete Galub
- Percussion: Alan Bezozi
- Harmony Vocals: Amy Allison
- Bass: Bryon Isaccs

"Understanding"

- Guitar: Pete Galub
- Drums: Mark Fredericks
- Percussion: Alan Bezozi
- Bass: Ken Heitmeuller
- Violin: Maxim Moston

"Boat"

- Guitar: Pete Galub
- Percussion: Alan Bezozi
- Organ & Vocals: Greta Gertler

"Huntsville, 1989"

- Electric Piano: Megan Hickey
- Programming: Dan Hickey

"Wintering In Brooklyn"

- Guitar: Pete Galub
- Drums: Mark Fredericks
- Bass: Ken Heitmeuller

"Foreign Land"

- Guitar: Pete Galub & Jeremy Parzen
- Harmony Vocals: Amy Allison
- Percussion: Alan Bezozi
- Bass: Bryon Isaacs
- Piano: Lois Toman
