= The Last Town Chorus (album) =

Studio album by The Last Town Chorus
- Released: February 24th 2003
- Recorded: 2002
- Genre: Indie
- Length: 37:11
- Label: Blast First

The Last Town Chorus chronology
The Last Town Chorus (2003)	Wire Waltz (2006)

The Last Town Chorus is the debut album by The Last Town Chorus.

The Skinny rated it three stars, stating "Granted, Wire Waltz won't appeal to vast swathes of the listening public, but if it's music to soothe the soul that's needed, The Last Town Chorus will do it with class."

== Track listing ==
The Last Town Chorus track listing
No.	Title	Length
1.	"Change Your Mind"	3:49
2.	"Dear City"	4:03
3.	"Brooklyn Navy Yard, 1950"	4:08
4.	"Ten Mile"	4:29
5.	"The Ground"	2:56
6.	"Oregon"	5:05
7.	"Little Star"	3:40
8.	"State Fair"	5:01
9.	"Try"	4:00
Total length:		37:11
