= Criteo =

Online display advertisement company

Criteo S.A.
- Type: Public
- Traded as: Nasdaq: CRTO
- ISIN: LU3433852426
- Industry: Online Advertising
- Founded: 2005; 21 years ago
- Headquarters: Paris, France
- Revenue: ▲US$1.94 billion (2025)
- Net income: ▲US$145 million (2025)
- Number of employees: 3600 (2025)
- Website: criteo.com

Criteo S.A. is an advertising technology company. Originally focused on online display retargeting, it has expanded since the mid-2010s into retail media advertising. The company was founded and is headquartered in Paris, France.

== History ==
Criteo was founded in Paris, France, in 2005 by Jean-Baptiste Rudelle, Franck Le Ouay and Romain Niccoli. Criteo spent the first four years focused on R&D, and launched its first product in April 2008. In 2010, Criteo opened an office in Silicon Valley. In 2012, Criteo opened its new headquarters in Paris, France.

On April 7, 2011, Criteo announced that it hired Greg Coleman as president. Previously, Coleman served as president and chief revenue officer of The Huffington Post and executive vice president of global sales for Yahoo!.

In October 2013, the firm completed an initial public offering (IPO), raising US$251 million.

On 1 January 2016, Rudelle became the executive chairman, while Eric Eichmann, who was the president and chief operating officer (COO), was promoted to chief executive officer. In June 2016, Criteo alleged Steelhouse, a rival ad tech company, had falsely taken credit for user visits to retailers' web pages in a lawsuit. Steelhouse countersued, alleging Criteo of false advertising and unfair competition. After an injunction requested by Criteo was denied in October 2016, both parties chose to mutually dropped their lawsuits in November 2016. On 4 October 2016, Criteo acquired HookLogic, a retail exchange, ad server and attribution company focused squarely on retailers, strengthening its ecommerce serving capabilities.

In October 2017, Criteo appointed Mollie Spilman as COO.

With the implementation of the Intelligent Tracking Prevention (ITP) feature from Apple's Safari 11 onwards in September 2017, Criteo's revenue was reduced by $25 million in 2017. However, Criteo reportedly was working on a “sustainable solution for the long-term” at the end of 2017, and had redesigned its "platform architecture" since. Criteo was also impacted by the perception that the General Data Protection Regulation would negatively affect the company.

In April 2018, Rudelle returned as the CEO, with Eichmann being his advisor. Under Rudelle, Criteo slowly transitioned from a single product (web advertising) to a multi-product platform, which included in-app and email advertising. Criteo's revenue did not grow in 2018, and was down 1%.

On 19 October 2019, Megan Clarken was appointed as the new CEO, taking over from Rudelle. Clarken would continue Criteo's transformation plan.

On February 15, 2025, Michael Komasinski took over as CEO and member of the Board, replacing Megan Clarken. Previously, Komasinski was CEO of the Americas, President of Global Data & Technology, and member of the Group Executive Management team at dentsu.

At the end of 2025, it was announced that Criteo would be moving to the United States, via Luxembourg. Les Echos referred to this as an 'exile,' a 'symbol of the French Tech's shortcomings'.

== Product ==
Criteo's product is a form of display advertising, which displays interactive banner advertisements, generated based on the online browsing preferences and behaviour of each customer. The solution operates on a pay per click/cost per click (CPC) basis.

In September 2010, Criteo debuted its self-service cost-per-click (CPC) bidding platform that lets advertisers place bids on display retargeting campaigns and see changes and optimize campaigns in real-time. During 2020, Criteo launched a traffic generation product, which allows advertisers to advertise using purchase intent data.

Criteo introduced a self-service platform for its Retail Media division in 2020, allowing advertisers to purchase advertising space on retailers' websites. Retail media became the company's main strategic priority under previous chief executive Megan Clarken, and Criteo's retail media revenue grew 25% year on year in 2024. Acquisitions made as part of this shift included the retail media technology firm Mabaya and the advertising technology company IPONWEB, the latter for $380 million. In September 2025, Criteo became Google's first onsite retail media partner, initially through a limited beta integration with Google Search Ads 360.

== Funding ==
Criteo secured a total of $17 million in funding, with €3 million in a first institutional round in March 2006 coming from French private equity firm AGF and Elaia Partners, and €9 million in a second round in January 2008 led by Index Ventures.

In May 2010, Criteo raised a further $7 million of funding from Bessemer Venture Partners.

== Privacy ==
In September 2010, Criteo began a campaign regarding the use of popular retargeting and its impact on consumer privacy. The campaign aimed to reassure consumers about personalized retargeting and data-driven marketing tactics.

The company denies it relies on personally identifiable information (PII) and doesn't track identifiable information, no data is shared with advertisers or publishers and no third-party data is used for targeting purposes. Retargeting only uses anonymous information from the merchant's site.

In 2019, Privacy International filed a complaint against Criteo, citing that it wouldn't respect the European GDPR. Complaints by NOYB were also made. In June 2023, the French data protection authority National Commission on Informatics and Liberty pronounced a sanction of 40 million euros against Criteo, notably for failing to check that the people whose data it processes have given their consent.

== See also ==
- Ad Tracking
- Website visitor tracking
