= Eddie Gossling =

American actor

Edward Gossling is an American stand-up comedian. He is known for his absurd humor and his voice work in Disney's motion picture The Wild. He is married to fellow stand-up comedian Megan Mooney.

Gossling made his Network Television debut in February 2004 on ABC's late night talk show Jimmy Kimmel Live!, and can be seen in his own half-hour comedy special as Comedy Central Presents Eddie Gossling. His special in 2005 was voted the number 4 best special ever produced by Comedy Central in the Stand-up Stand Off.

== Personal background ==
Gossling was born in Johnson City, NY, in 1970 while his father, Edward Haines Gossling III, was away at pilot training in the Air Force. He lived in New York City before moving to Los Angeles. Gossling has a younger brother Eric, who lives in Austin, Texas. His father retired from the Air Force in San Antonio after 30 years of service, mostly as a B-52 bomber pilot. Gossling's mother, Sandra, was a teacher at the bases they were stationed at. After his father's retirement, his parents moved to Tampa, FL.

Gossling's brother, Eric, once threw a Chinese star at him in retaliation for hyper-extending his knee during a pickup basketball game when they were children. Luckily, Gossling was wearing a thick winter jacket.

Gossling attended four different high schools growing up, due to his father's job in the Air Force. He eventually graduated from Airline High School in Bossier City, LA. Gossling claims that traveling from city to city growing up was the best thing that could have happened to prepare for him for his current job.

“Get to know a new group of kids, make them laugh, fit in and then leave to a new place to do it all again.”

Gossling's favorite comics to watch growing up were Steve Martin, Albert Brooks, Bob Newhart, Richard Pryor, Eddie Murphy and Sam Kinison.

Gossling lettered in three sports; wrestling, football and track. After failing to get recruited by Nebraska to play football for the Cornhuskers he declined to go straight to college and instead joined the military and enlisted in the Louisiana Army National Guard. He was shipped to Fort Jackson South Carolina for his Basic Training.

He attended Louisiana Tech University for one year then transferred to San Antonio College in San Antonio, TX and the Texas Army National Guard. He acquired an associate degree in Advertising design then enrolled at Southwest Texas State in San Marcos, TX. Gossling left Southwest two semesters short of his degree when he got involved in stand-up comedy in San Antonio at River Center Comedy Club 1994 where he met Chris Duel, now a radio personality in San Antonio, then the house MC at the club. He took on several odd jobs while starting out in comedy and then moved up to the Capital City Comedy Club in Austin in 1996 where he house MC'd for nearly a year.

== Professional background ==
In addition to working comedy clubs across the U.S. and Canada, Gossling has appeared in nationally recognized comedy festivals. He has appeared at the Vancouver and Chicago Comedy Festivals and became one of the first ever comedians to perform at the Montreal Just For Laughs Comedy Festival as both a "New Faces" performer and "Festival Gala" performer in the same year. Gossling has been seen nationwide on Comedy Central's Premium Blend, also Comics Unleashed with Byron Allen and the Game Show Network's National Lampoon’s Funny Money.

Gossling was a voice actor on the Comedy Central animated series, Shorties Watchin' Shorties, October 2005 on the Bravo channels, The Great Things About Being Red State, this fall on Comedy Central's World Comedy Tour taped in Australia. In 2006, Gossling voiced Scraw the Vulture in the Disney Animated film, The Wild.

Gossling has two CDs. The first entitled Fresh Brewed Eddie and the second "live from the DC Improv: Eddie Gossling." In an effort to take names back from the porn industry, Gossling in 2007 purchased bigpoletighthole.com where he also hosts his web site.

In May 2008, Gossling won The Roofie Award at the first annual Aspen RooftopComedy Festival.

Eddie was a writer and producer for the Comedy Central show, Tosh.0 hosted by Daniel Tosh.

== Discography ==
- Fresh Brewed Eddie (2006) Fresh Brewed Eddie
- Live at the DC Improv (2008) - only available on iTunes Eddie Gossling Live at the DC Improv

== Filmography ==
- Comedy Central Presents (2005)
- The Wild (2006)
