= Megan Beveridge =

Scottish soldier, piper

- Education: Army Foundation College
- Occupation: soldier
- Relatives: Kerry Ann Beveridge

Megan Beveridge (born 16 March 1995) is a Scottish soldier who became the first regular army, female "lone piper" at the Royal Edinburgh Military Tattoo. The Lance Bombardier from Burntisland, in Fife was also the first female to pass the army's pipe major course. Aged 21, she is also the youngest person to date to have passed.

== Early life and education ==
Beveridge started playing the bagpipes at the age of nine, after she was inspired by her sister Kerry-Ann. She later joined The Black Watch Cadets Pipes as well as the Royal Burgh of Inverkeithing Pipe Band.

She has enjoyed since childhood supporting her national rugby team and the English championship team Ealing Trailfinders. She aspired to make the Scottish national team however due to a severe ACL injury, was never able to get capped.

== Army career ==
She joined the army after leaving school at the age of 16 and completed a year at the Army Foundation College in Harrogate. She is a member of 19th Regiment Royal Artillery, The Scottish Gunners. She chose the Gunners to improve her prospects as a piper. When she is not piping she is a Transport Junior non-commissioned officer, co-ordinating transport for the day-to-day running of the regiment.

=== Lone piper ===
In August 2016, she was chosen to take on the prestigious role of the Lone Piper at the Royal Edinburgh Military Tattoo. She played the lament 'Sleep Dearie Sleep' on the ramparts of Edinburgh Castle to an 8,800-strong audience.

"It [piping] takes a bit of practice and you need quite a lot of patience - there's a technique to it," she told the BBC who chose her as one of their 100 Women in 2016.

Her ambition is to one day be appointed the Army's senior Pipe Major and eventually become the Sovereign's Piper.

Funeral of HM Queen Elizabeth II

On September 19, 2022, Megan had the honour and privilege of playing in both the London and Windsor funeral processions. This was a task unlike any other and her most challenging to date. She first played for Elizabeth II at the age of 15 and later performed at events at Buckingham Palace, Balmoral Castle, The Breamar Highland Gathering and on Salisbury Plain Training Area.
