= Megan McKenzie =

South African model (born 1980)

- Born: Megan McKenzie; 1 January 1980 (age 46); South Africa
- Modeling information
- Height: 5 ft 9.5 in (1.77 m)
- Hair color: Blonde
- Eye color: Green

Megan McKenzie (born 1 January 1980) is a South African model. She has been voted South Africa's sexiest woman by readers of FHM in 2003, ranking behind only Halle Berry.

She is the sister of South African international cricketer Neil McKenzie.
