= Megan Clarken =

Media executive and former youth athlete

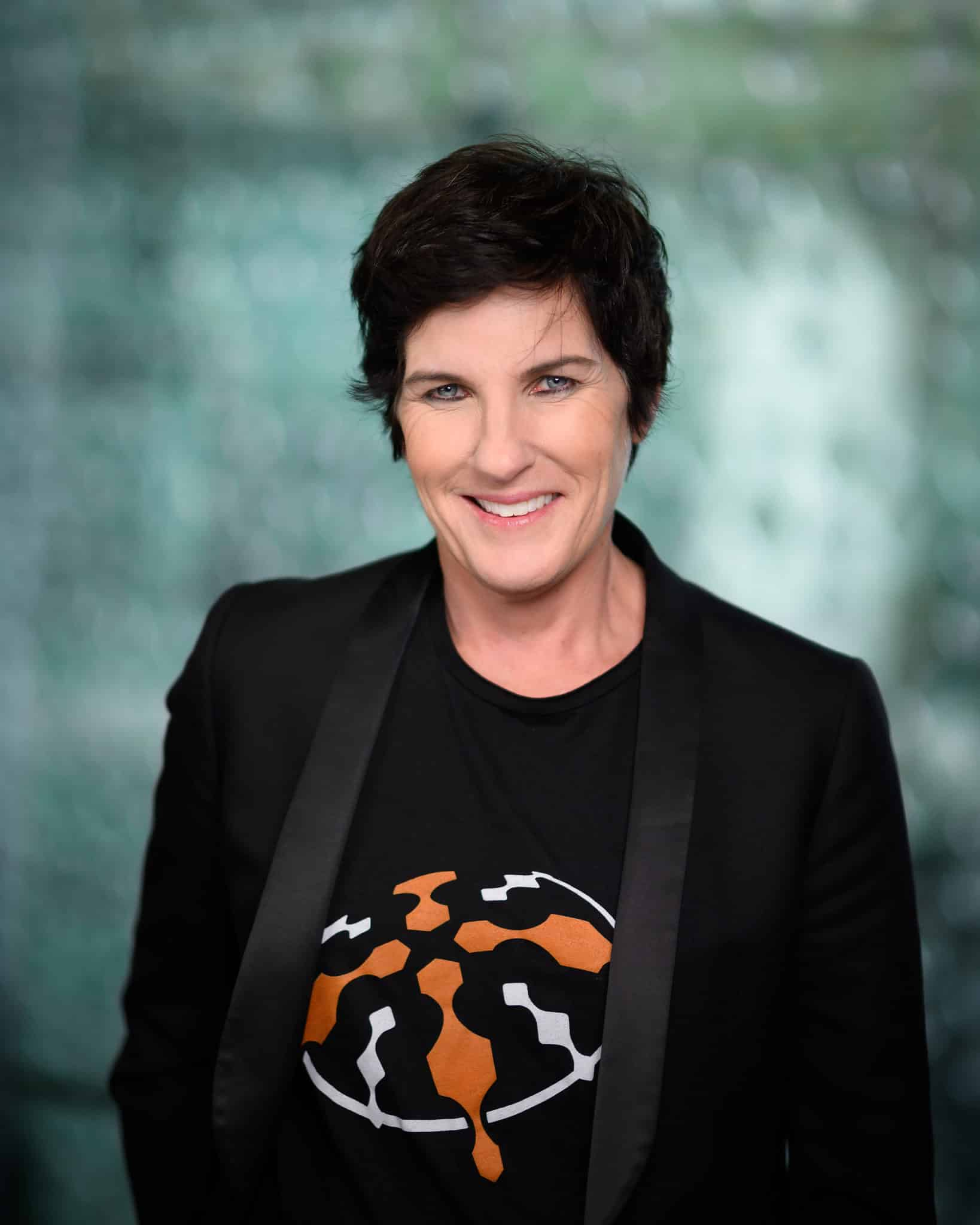
Megan Clarken, media executive and former youth athlete from New Zealand

Megan Clarken (born 30 October 1966) is a media executive and former youth athlete from New Zealand. In November 2019, Clarken was appointed chief executive officer at Criteo, an ad-tech company based in France. She has received several accolades, including being recognized as one of HERoes 100 Women Role Model Executives for four consecutive years from 2020 to 2023. She is also a current member of the Capgemini Group Board of Directors. She advocates for diversity and inclusion and speaks out against modern slavery.

== Athletic career ==
Clarken grew up in Auckland, New Zealand, one of four children and spent her youth focused on track and field. She represented New Zealand from a young age in the 100M, 200M, high jump, long jump and heptathlon events.

In 1984, Clarken represented Oceania at the World Cup in Canberra, Australia. Although aiming for Olympic and Commonwealth selection, Clarken suffered a serious injury to her left knee and retired from track and field.

== Business career ==
Clarken has held senior leadership positions for large publishers and online technology providers in Australia, including Akamai Technologies and measurement company Nielsen, which she joined in 2004. She worked for Nielsen until 2019, having risen to the position of chief commercial officer for Nielsen Global Media. In 2019, Clarken became chief executive officer at Criteo, and was added to Criteo’s Board of Directors in 2020.

== Affiliations and awards ==
Clarken has received leadership awards including the 2015 Cynopsis Media: Top Women in Digital Industry Leaders, the 2016 Multichannel News: Wonder Women and the 2019 National Organization for Women: Women of Power and Influence.
