= Megan Kufeld =

American soccer player (born 1993)

Personal information
- Full name: Megan Nicole Kufeld
- Date of birth: March 25, 1993 (age 33)
- Place of birth: Fremont, California, United States
- Height: 5 ft 8 in (1.73 m)
- Position: Goalkeeper

College career
Years	Team	Apps	(Gls)
2011–2015	Washington Huskies	67	(0)

Senior career*
Years	Team	Apps	(Gls)
2012–2014	Seattle Sounders		
2016	Sundsvalls DFF	1	(0)
2017	Medkila IL	1	(0)

International career
2009	United States U17		
2012	United States U20		
2012–2014	United States U23		
- * Club domestic league appearances and goals

Megan Nicole Kufeld (born March 25, 1993) is an American former soccer goalkeeper who played for Medkila IL of the Norwegian Toppserien. She previously represented Sundsvalls DFF of the Swedish Elitettan and Seattle Sounders Women in the United Soccer Leagues W-League.

== Early life ==
Born in Fremont, California to Melinda and Bob Kufeld, Megan attended Washington High School where she was her class valedictorian and received honors from her school's science department.

=== University of Washington Huskies, 2011–2015 ===
Kufeld attended the University of Washington where she majored in biology with a focus on molecular and cellular biology. She was named a UW President's Medalist for her academic achievement during her sophomore year. She committed to play for the Washington Huskies women's soccer team for 2011 and redshirted for the season.

During her senior season in 2015, she was twice-named Pac-12 Conference Goalkeeper of the Week. In September of the same year, she tied and later broke the school's shutout record previously held by Hope Solo.

== Club career ==
In February 2016, Kufeld signed with Swedish club Sundsvalls DFF.

== International career ==
Kufeld has represented the United States at the under-14, under-17, under-20 and under-23 levels.

== Post-Soccer Life ==
After retiring from professional soccer, Kufeld entered the private sector as a Research Technician for Fred Hutch in Seattle, Washington. She currently works as a Senior Research Associate at Seagen.

She married Trevor Mitsui on May 18, 2024.
