= Megan Olson =

American painter (born 1971)

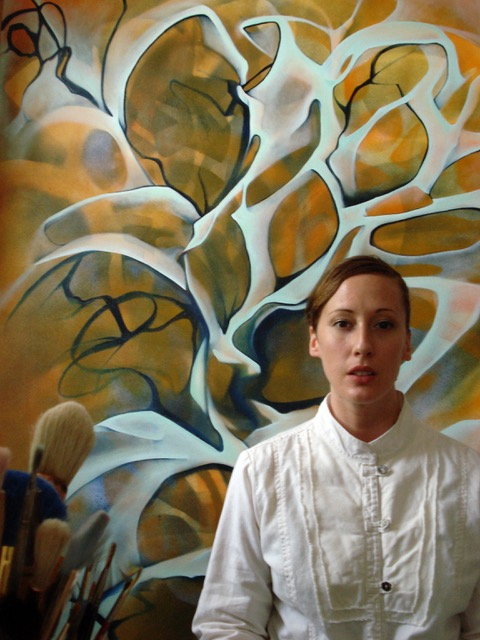
- Olson in 2008
- Born: 1971 (age 54–55); New Milford, Connecticut, U.S.
- Education: San Francisco Art Institute
- Occupation: Artist
- Website: Megan Olson

Megan Olson is an American painter born in 1971. She was raised in rural Connecticut, and has lived in Los Angeles, San Francisco, San Diego, New York, and Berlin. She currently works out of her studio on the Lower East Side of New York City. Olson received her BFA from the San Francisco Art Institute in 2002, and was discovered by Maxwell Davidson Gallery while attending the AICAD New York Studio Residency Program. Olson is a member of American Abstract Artists.

== Work ==
Olson creates abstract works in gouache, watercolor, graphite, spray paint and oil paint, on paper and canvas. The artist describes her work as drawing on influences from the canon of art history ranging from Japanese scroll paintings to graffiti.

American art critic and essayist Hilton Kramer described Olson's work as depicting "the dynamic processes of nature with a precision, stability and concreteness that are traditionally reserved for the painting of inert, three-dimensional objects." Kramer says "the result of this concentrated attention to the nuances of nature is a pictorial style that’s at once highly abstract and persuasively realist in its fidelity to observed detail."

== Critical reception ==
Hilton Kramer noted the artist's use of color to "generate a sense of energy and movement," as in the work Fiery Ocean of which he wrote, "swirling traces of light disport themselves in a ruby-red sea," calling the result "unfailingly original and compelling."

== Solo exhibitions ==
- 2014 Beyond the Chains of Illusion, Berlin Art Projects, Istanbul, Turkey
- 2012 Legible Fiction, Davidson Contemporary, New York, NY
- 2010 Beyond the Chains of Illusion, Berlin Art Projects, Berlin, Germany
- 2009 Spray Paintings, Davidson Contemporary, New York, NY
- 2007 Urban Nature, Maxwell Davidson Gallery, New York, NY
- 2005 Still Movement, Maxwell Davidson Gallery, New York, NY
- 2003 Synapsis, Maxwell Davidson Gallery, New York, NY
- 2001 Organic Abstractions, Maxwell Davidson Gallery, New York, NY
