= Megan Hunt =

Megan Hunt may refer to:

- Megan Hunt (footballer) (born 1995), Australian footballer
- Megan Hunt (politician) (born 1986), Nebraska state senator
- Megan Hunt (Body of Proof), a fictional character in the TV series Body of Proof
- Megan Hunt (Grey's Anatomy), a fictional character in the TV series Grey's Anatomy
