= Megan Davies =

Megan Davies may refer to:

- Megan Davies (musician) (born 1944), English former member of The Applejacks
- Megan Davies (rugby union) (born 2002), Welsh rugby union player
- Megan Carter Davies (born 1996), British orienteering competitor
