= Megan Page =

Megan Page or Paige may refer to:

- Megan Page, see 2012 Women's World Junior Squash Championships
- Megan Page, musician in Frightwig
- Megan Paige, character in The Alphabet Killer
