= Meagan Harbison =

Dominican footballer (born 1995)

Personal information
- Full name: Meagan Mercedes Harbison Felipe
- Birth name: Meagan Mercedes Harbison
- Date of birth: 1 April 1995 (age 31)
- Place of birth: San Diego, California, United States
- Height: 1.63 m (5 ft 4 in)
- Position: Centre back

College career
Years	Team	Apps	(Gls)
2013–2017	Pepperdine Waves	80	(2)

International career^{‡}
2021–	Dominican Republic	1	(0)
- ‡ National team caps and goals as of 18 February 2021.

Meagan Mercedes Harbison Felipe (born 1 April 1995) is an American-born Dominican footballer who plays as a centre back for the Dominican Republic women's national team.

== Early life ==
Harbison was born in San Diego, California and raised in the Rancho Peñasquitos neighborhood.

== College career ==
Harbison has attended the Pepperdine University in Malibu, California.

== International career ==
Harbison's mother is Dominican. She made her senior debut for the Dominican Republic on 18 February 2021 in a friendly home match against Puerto Rico.

== Personal life ==
Harbison's younger sister Hailey Harbison is also a footballer who plays for North Carolina Courage in the National Women's Soccer League. She is of Irish descent through her father, while her mother is Afro-Dominican.
