= Megan Ryther =

American swimmer

Personal information
- Full name: Megan Ryther
- Nationality: United States
- Born: July 3, 1979 (age 47) Kankakee, IL

Sport
- Sport: Swimming
- Strokes: Freestyle
- Club: Alamo Area Aquatics

Megan Ryther (born July 3, 1979, in Kankakee, IL) is a female freestyle swimmer from United States. She represented her native country at the 1998 World Aquatics Championships in Perth, Western Australia, competing in one individual events (5 km). She competes in open water and her last result was 17th place in World Open Water Championship in 2003.
