= Megan Jean and the KFB =

Musical duo from South Carolina

Megan Jean and the KFB (Klay Family Band) is an American folk punk band, originally consisting of vocalist and multi instrumentalist Megan Jean and her husband, upright bassist and banjo player Byrne Klay, based in Charleston, South Carolina. The band is known for its eclectic sound and unique instrumentation, referring to themselves as “Like a metal band if it was 1927.” Since 2004 they’ve toured continuously, performing together at more than 2000+ shows, festivals, and various gigs.

After more than 15 years as a duo, by late 2021 “the KFB” added a third member to their band, drummer Tommy Bailey, and began playing and touring as a trio, calling themselves Megan Jean’s Secret Family. By 2023, they’d added a fourth member to their lineup: Young Bill.

Megan Jean’s Secret Family is now: Megan Jean (lead vocals, bass) and Byrne Klay (guitar, vocals), along with Tommy Bailey (drums & keys, vocals) and Young Bill (guitar, vocals) now added to the original husband and wife “KFB” lineup. The band is currently based out of the northern Appalachian mountains/western Maryland.

== Music ==
Jean and Klay met in New York in 2004 and almost immediately hit the road together, beginning their “endless tour,” and calling themselves Megan Jean and the Klay Family Band (or KFB). Performing original songs led by Jean's gutsy vocals and often dark lyrics and melodic sensibility, the band began developing a devoted fanbase in local clubs and venues. Their earlier work has been described as an example of steampunk music.

The two sold most of their belongings and booked their own tour, beginning in fall 2007, spending 14 months completely transient until settling down in Charleston. They released their first album, Autumn, in 2007, and their second, Dead Woman Walking, in 2010 under the label Guts and Know How Records. They subsequently began touring full-time across the eastern United States.

They self-released their second full-length album, The Devil Herself in February 2013. While writing songs for the band's second album, the two appeared in more than 200 performances in 2011 in 32 states, opened for acts including Shovels & Rope and appeared on the PBS music travel series Music Voyager.

They released their third full-length album, Tarantistas, in 2018. During the nearly two decades that the husband and wife duo have been singing, recording, and touring, they have performed together in more than 2000+ shows.

=== Megan Jean’s Secret Family ===
In 2021, Tommy Bailey, the drummer for the band Fletcher’s Grove joined “the KFB” and they now call themselves Megan Jean’s Secret Family. By 2023, the group added a fourth member, Young Bill on guitar, and recorded PLOT, their debut album, which was released by year’s end. Their sound has been described as an eclectic mix: Americana, Rock, Blues, and Folk.

== Band members ==
=== Megan Jean ===
Megan Jean was born on May 25, 1983, in Tunkhannock, Pennsylvania, and grew up primarily on the west coast, in California, Oregon, and Washington. She moved to New York when she was 18 to attend Tisch School of the Arts at New York University, studying musical theater with a concentration on voice. Her first day of classes was September 11, 2001. Both of her parents played guitar and wrote original music, which is where she initially learned about music composition and began to play guitar at age 11. She is known for having absolute pitch as well as playing the washboard, which she started in 2009 after someone lent her one. Before forming the band, she played the New York acoustic club scene and shared the stage with Kevin Devine, Kaki King, Langhorne Slim, Kimya Dawson and Paleface.

=== Byrne Klay ===
Byrne Klay was born on March 29, 1980, in Mexico City, Mexico and raised in White Plains, New York. His younger brother is award-winning writer Phil Klay.

Byrne Klay studied double bass at the Oberlin Conservatory of Music and New School University. He toured for several years with a punk band called Dynamite Club, visiting Japan, Taiwan, Europe, Australia and the United States. Klay performed on one of their albums, “It's A Lot Deeper Than Most People Actually Think”.

Klay has delved into a lot of experimental music during his career, playing with such notables as Assif Tsahar, Cooper-Moore, Mike Pride and Todd Colburn. Klay played bass in the Brooklyn alt-country band Sugarpine, and was featured on their 2006 album “Ball Peen Hammer.” He learned to play banjo in 2008, studying from the Internet.

== Reception ==
Since their beginnings in 2004, Megan Jean and the KFB has received acclaim from media in the United States as well as the United Kingdom. Jim Reed of Connect Savannah wrote "...the intriguing combination of Jean's literate lyricism (and almost theatrical approach to vocals) and Klay's highly disciplined composition [is] the backbone of their sparse, but emotionally satisfying style." Andy Riggs of Americana UK praised the band's "superb songs and intimate sound". The Charleston City Paper celebrated their "...wealth of gorgeous tunes that brilliantly [merge] American roots music with exotic elements of Euro/gypsy styles."

In 2012, the band was featured in an episode of the internationally acclaimed music and travel series, Music Voyager, titled "Cradle of Country Music", dedicated to the music scene in Bristol, Tennessee.
