= Megan Anderson =

Megan Anderson, may refer to:

- Megan Anderson (fighter) (born 1990), Australian MMA fighter
- Megan Anderson (netball) (born 1974), Australian netballer
