= Megan Hanson =

Me(a)gan Hanson may refer to:

- Megan Hanson, character in Premonition (2007 film)
- Megan Barton Hanson, in Love Island (2015 TV series, series 4)
- Meagan Hanson, politician
