= Megan Walsh =

Megan Walsh may refer to:

- Megan Walsh (footballer) (born 1994), English footballer
- Megan Walsh (singer) (born 1997), Irish singer
- Megan Walsh (Coronation Street), a fictional character
