= The Last Town Chorus =

American band

- Origin: U.S.
- Genres: Indie rock/Pop/Alt-Country/Folk
- Years active: 2001–present
- Labels: HackTone Records
- Members: Megan Hickey
- Past members: Nat Guy

The Last Town Chorus is a pop/rock/alternative country band from Brooklyn, New York. Founded in 2001, the only consistent member of the band is singer/lap steel guitarist Megan Hickey, who performs with a variety of backup ensembles. Originally a duo, guitarist Nat Guy left the band after the release of its first album.

The Last Town Chorus has toured in the United States, United Kingdom, Australia and Canada, collecting praise from Spin, The New York Times, Chicago Tribune and The Village Voice in the US, and Uncut and The Sunday Times in the UK. Her cover of David Bowie's "Modern Love" was featured on ABC's medical drama Grey's Anatomy and The Learning Channel's Diana: Last Day of a Princess.

The Last Town Chorus has toured with Mark Olson of The Jayhawks, Guillemots, The Weakerthans, Camera Obscura and Michael Penn. In Spring 2008, they toured with Kathleen Edwards. In March 2008, The Last Town Chorus released the single "Loud and Clear," which is the first new track released since their 2007 CD Wire Waltz.

In December 2010 the track "Still Burnin'" was released as a download single.

== Discography ==
- The Last Town Chorus, (2003)
- Wire Waltz, (2006)
