= Megan Compston =

Australian cricketer (born 1980)

Personal information
- Born: 21 November 1980 (age 45)
- Batting: Right-handed
- Bowling: Right-arm medium
- Role: Bowler

Domestic team information
- Years: Team
- 2007/08: Victoria

Career statistics
Competition	WLA
Matches	2
Runs scored	3
Batting average	3.00
100s/50s	0/0
Top score	3
Balls bowled	30
Wickets	0
Bowling average	–
5 wickets in innings	–
10 wickets in match	–
Best bowling	–
Catches/stumpings	0/–
- Source: CricketArchive, 3 July 2021

Megan Compston (born 21 November 1980) is a former Australian cricketer. A right-arm medium bowler, she played two List A matches for Victoria during the 2007–08 season of the Women's National Cricket League (WNCL).

Compston also played 211 matches for Essendon Maribyrnong Park Ladies Cricket Club (EMPLCC).
