= Arthur Povey =

English cricketer (1886–1946)

Personal information
- Born: 16 May 1886; West Bromwich, Staffordshire
- Died: 13 February 1946 (aged 59); Tonbridge, Kent
- Batting: Right-handed
- Role: Wicket-keeper

Domestic team information
- Years: Team
- 1921–1922: Kent
- FC debut: 28 May 1921 Kent v Northants
- Last FC: 24 June 1922 Kent v Yorkshire

Career statistics
Competition	First-class
Matches	5
Runs scored	64
Batting average	16.00
100s/50s	0/0
Top score	21*
Catches/stumpings	5/1
- Source: ESPNcricinfo, 5 March 2025

Arthur Povey (16 May 1886 – 13 February 1946) was an English cricketer and cricket coach. He saw active service during World War I, played first-class cricket in the early 1920s, and was later employed at Tonbridge School in Kent.

== Early life ==
Povey was born at West Bromwich in 1886, the son of Alfred and Sarah (née Taylor) Povey. His father worked in the metal finishing trade, an industry that at least two of Povey's four brothers entered. Povey, however, became a painter and decorator, first at Smethwick before moving to Dartford in Kent in 1908.

A wicket-keeper, Povey was recommended to Kent County Cricket Club by Fred Huish, the side's established keeper, as a possible recruit for the Tonbridge Nursery, Kent's player development centre established to train young professional cricketers. There were no places available at the Nursery, but he played for the county's Second XI during 1912 and in each year until the outbreak of World War I. With Huish and Jack Hubble in the Kent side, there was little opportunity to gain a place in the First XI, and Povey did not make his first-class debut until after the war.

== Wartime service ==
Povey joined the Kent Fortress Royal Engineers at the beginning of 1915, recruited by Kent bowler Colin Blythe. As a skilled craftsman, Povey was a valuable recruit and spent most of the war employed on the home front in 1/6th company, based initially at Southborough. The company was attached to 73rd Division, with Povey serving first as a 2nd corporal and then as acting sergeant.

It was not until 73rd Division was disbanded in early 1918 that Povey joined an active service company, training first at the Royal School of Military Engineering at Chatham before embarking for the Western Front later in the year. He joined the 9th Field Company RE in May, reverting to his rank of 2nd corporal.

After being wounded in June and later spending time in hospital following a bicycle accident, Povey saw active service later in the summer. The company was active during the Battle of the Scarpe and at Drocourt-Quéant during the Hundred Days Offensive. It was employed constructing bridges and railway lines to ensure supplies reached the front line effectively, and later in the year saw action at the Battle of the Selle and Battle of Valenciennes. The company was at Valenciennes when the Armistice was declared in November 1918, and Povey was demobilised in early 1919.

== Post-war life ==
A place at the Tonbridge Nursery became available in 1919, and Povey joined the facility. He played Second XI cricket in 1920 before making four first-class appearances for Kent the following season, debuting against Northamptonshire in late May, although he did not keep wicket. Scores of 21 and seven, both not out as a lower order batsman, saw him retain his place in the side for the team's next match, and he replaced Jack Hubble as wicket-keeper for two matches later in the season.

Although Huish had retired, with Hubble and George Wood- both of whom were better batsmen than Povey- in the Kent side, Povey's opportunities were very limited. He played in only one more match for the First XI, a June 1922 fixture against Yorkshire at Headingley. The emergence of Les Ames as another wicket-keeper in 1924 saw Povey released from the Nursery at the end of the season, and he played no more cricket for Kent sides.

The following year, Povey joined Tonbridge School as the cricket professional, coaching young cricketers and umpiring matches. He spent 20 years working at the school and was considered a popular and "much-loved" coach. He had married Agnes Paice in 1916, and was due to retire in December 1946. The Tonbridgian believed that this caused Povey to become depressed and he died by suicide on the school grounds in February 1946. He was aged 59.

== Bibliography ==
- Carlaw, Derek (2005). "Leslie Ames". Kent County Cricket Club Annual 2005. Canterbury: Kent County Cricket Club. ISBN 978-09-52792-61-1.
- Carlaw, Derek (2020). Kent County Cricketers, A to Z: Part One (1806–1914) (PDF). Cardiff: ACS.
- Lewis, Paul (2014). For Kent and Country. Eastbourne: Reveille Press. ISBN 978-19-08336-63-7.
