= Meagan McGrath =

Canadian aerospace engineer, mountaineer and explorer

- Born: 1977 (age 48–49); Toronto, Ontario
- Education: Royal Military College of Canada
- Occupation: aerospace engineer
- Known for: first Canadian to ski unassisted to the South Pole

Meagan McGrath (born 1977) is a Canadian aerospace engineer, mountaineer and explorer. She has climbed the world's top seven summits, visited the North Pole and she is the first Canadian to ski unassisted to the South Pole.

== Life ==
McGrath was born in Toronto, Ontario, but grew up in Sudbury, Ontario. She studied chemistry at the Royal Military College of Canada and became an aerospace engineer employed to the Canadian armed forces. McGrath went on a chance visit to Kilimanjaro and was intrigued by the experience and decided to try more challenges.

McGrath has climbed the highest summits on seven continents including Mount Everest. When she was descending from Everest she led the rescue of another mountaineer. It was on 21 May 2007 and she rescued Nepali Usha Bista. She was selected as a 2011 recipient of the Sir Edmund Hillary Foundation of Canada Humanitarian Award for her rescue. The award recognises a Canadian who has personally or administratively contributed a significant service or act in the Himalayan Region of Nepal.

She then negotiated with her employers to have a year off to try and climb the top five summits and to walk and ski to the South Pole. She completed the trek on Jan 16, 2010.

She has now climbed the seven continent's top summits, visited the North Pole and she is the first Canadian to have skied unassisted to the South Pole.

== Awards ==
In 2011 she was given the Sir Edmund Hillary Foundation of Canada Humanitarian Award. In 2012 she received an honorary doctorate from Laurentian University.
