= Megan Duffy (disambiguation) =

Megan Duffy (born 1984) is an American basketball coach.

Megan Duffy may also refer to:

- Megan Duffy (actress) (born 1979), American actress
- Meghan Duffy, American biologist and ecologist
- Meg Duffy, American guitarist
