= Megan Miller =

Megan Miller may refer to:

- Megan Miller (tennis) (born 1977), British-American professional tennis player
- Megan Miller, ring name of Canadian professional wrestler Laurel Van Ness
