= Megan E. McLaughlin =

Megan E. McLaughlin, DSW, retired in 2003 after serving 17 years as the executive director and CEO of the Federation of Protestant Welfare Agencies (FPWA).,

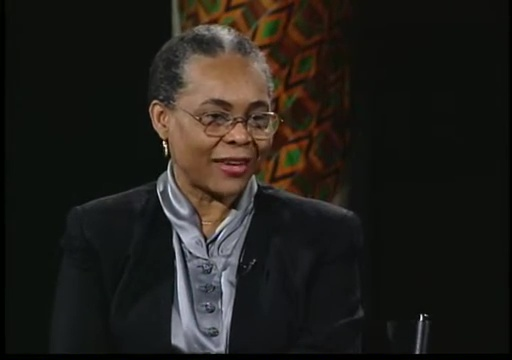
McLaughlin on CUNY TV's African American Legends, 1996

Columbia University School of Social Work awarded her a DSW. their Alumni Association inducted her into their Hall of Fame in 2014. She attended Howard University where she earned a BA in sociology and a MSW in 1962 and 1968.

== Career highlights ==
Under Mayor David Dinkins, she served as chair of his Commission for the Foster Care of Children and a member of the New York City administration for Children's Services advisory board. For the New York City chapter of the National Association of Social Workers (NASW), McLaughlin served as the First Vice President of the board of directors.
