= Megan Mooney =

American stand-up comedian (born 1974)

Megan Anne Mooney, (born 1974 in Houston, Texas) is an American stand-up comedian who has performed at the HBO Comedy Arts Festival and the Just for Laughs Comedy Festival in Montreal. She has appeared on Comedy Central's Premium Blend and in 2006 her own Comedy Central Presents episode debuted. Mooney transitioned from stand up comedy into television writing. She wrote for the Nickelodeon game show revival of FIGURE IT OUT seasons five and six. She also served as a consultant on Nickelodeon's Kids' Choice Awards in 2014, hosted by Mark Wahlberg. And currently she's a regular contributor on Comedy Central's Tosh.0. Mooney resides in Los Angeles with her husband Eddie Gossling, son Oliver and daughter Mia.
