= Megan Pauwels =

Australian cricketer (born 1976)

Personal information
- Born: 20 April 1976 (age 50)
- Batting: Right-handed
- Bowling: Right-arm off break
- Role: Bowler

Domestic team information
- Years: Team
- 1998/99–2007/08: Victoria

Career statistics
Competition	WLA	WT20
Matches	64	2
Runs scored	216	–
Batting average	14.40	–
100s/50s	0/1	–
Top score	53	–
Balls bowled	2,024	18
Wickets	53	0
Bowling average	21.92	–
5 wickets in innings	0	–
10 wickets in match	0	–
Best bowling	3/7	–
Catches/stumpings	14/–	0/–
- Source: CricketArchive, 11 July 2021

Megan Pauwels (née Foster; born 20 April 1976) is a former Australian cricketer. A right-arm off break bowler, she represented Victoria in 64 List A matches between the 1998–99 and 2007–08 seasons of the Women's National Cricket League (WNCL). She took 53 wickets in the WNCL, for an average of 21.92.
