= Megan Letter =

YouTube personality (born 1995)

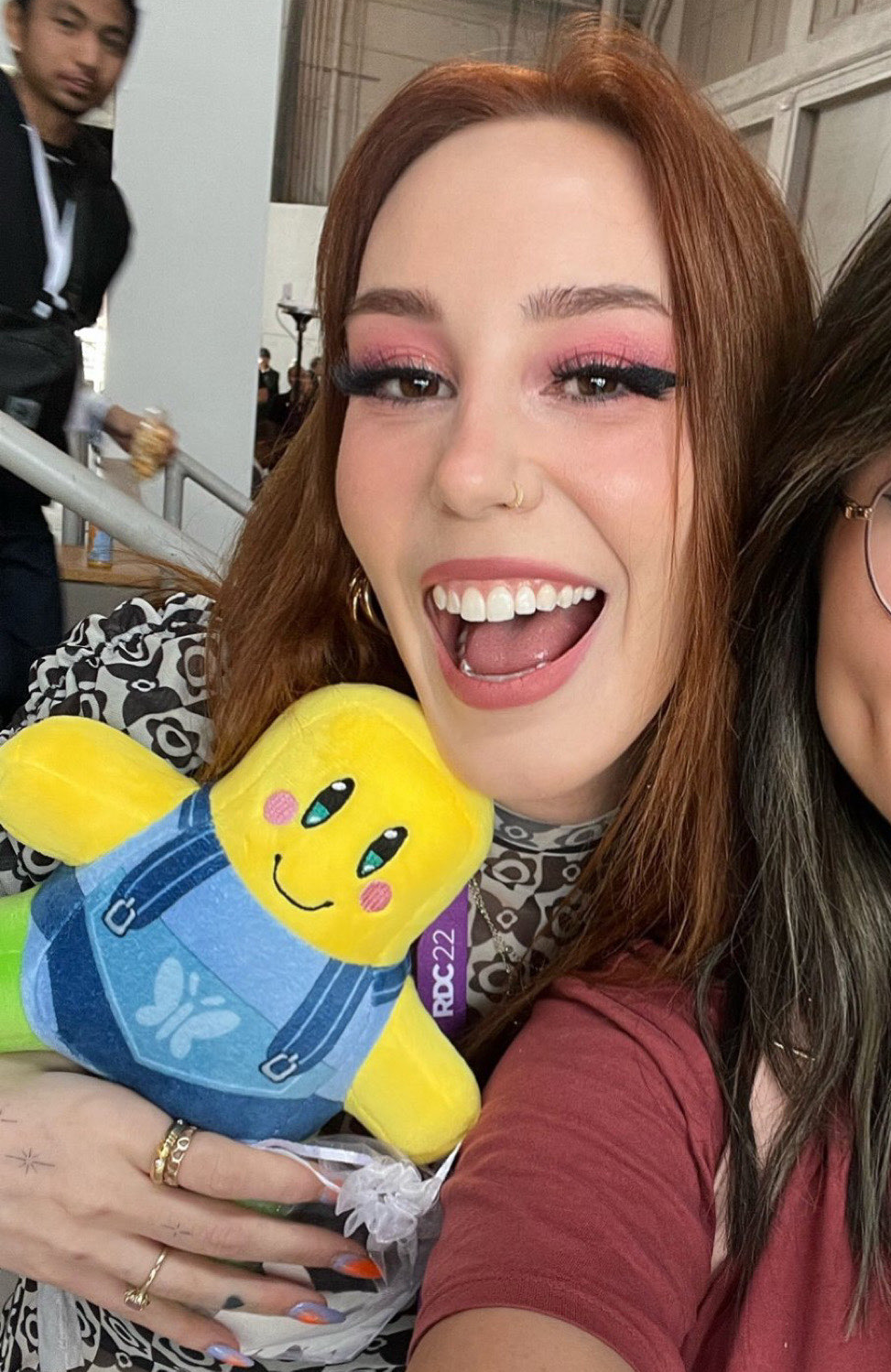
- Letter at the 2022 Roblox Developers Conference
- Born: Megan Leeds; March 17, 1995 (age 31); Texas
- Spouse: Zach Letter (m. 2019; div. 2025)

YouTube information
- Channel: MeganPlays
- Years active: 2014–present

Megan Letter (née Leeds; born March 17, 1995) is an American YouTuber primarily known for her Roblox videos on her YouTube channel, MeganPlays. Prior to YouTube, Letter studied graphic design in college.

== Careers ==
=== YouTube ===
In 2018, Megan created content about the video game, The Sims. After switching to Roblox after being unable to pay bills, she rapidly began gaining popularity. As of April 2021, Megan was getting 40 million monthly views and had more than three million subscribers on her channel, MeganPlays. She is most known for making videos about the games Adopt Me! and Royale High.

=== Wonder Works ===
Megan Letter
- Logo used since 2021
- Type: Video game development
- Industry: Gaming, Entertainment
- Founded: May 2020 (as a Roblox community); November 19, 2020; 5 years ago (as a company)
- Founder: Megan Letter and Zach Letter
- Headquarters: Arlington, Texas, U.S.
- Key people: Megan Letter (President); Zach Letter (CEO); Joshua Mixon (Director of Operations); Daniel Kolman (Creative Director)
- Owner: Zach Letter
- Number of employees: 70 (2022)
- Website: wonderworks.gg

In mid 2020, Letter and her ex-husband Zach created a Roblox game studio called, Wonder Works, also known as Wonder Works Studio, and is currently the President of that studio. One of the reasons was because Letter wanted more control over her content. Wonder Works also chose Roblox over Steam because most of Letter's online followers already had Roblox installed on their devices.

Their first release was, Overlook Bay, a game in which players can adopt a pet, build a house and explore the city. Overlook Bay has been played more than 160 million times. The studio has also released another game called, Traitor, among others. Letter also runs an online store called, Stay Peachy.
