= Megan Povey =

English food physicist (died 2026)

Megan J. Povey
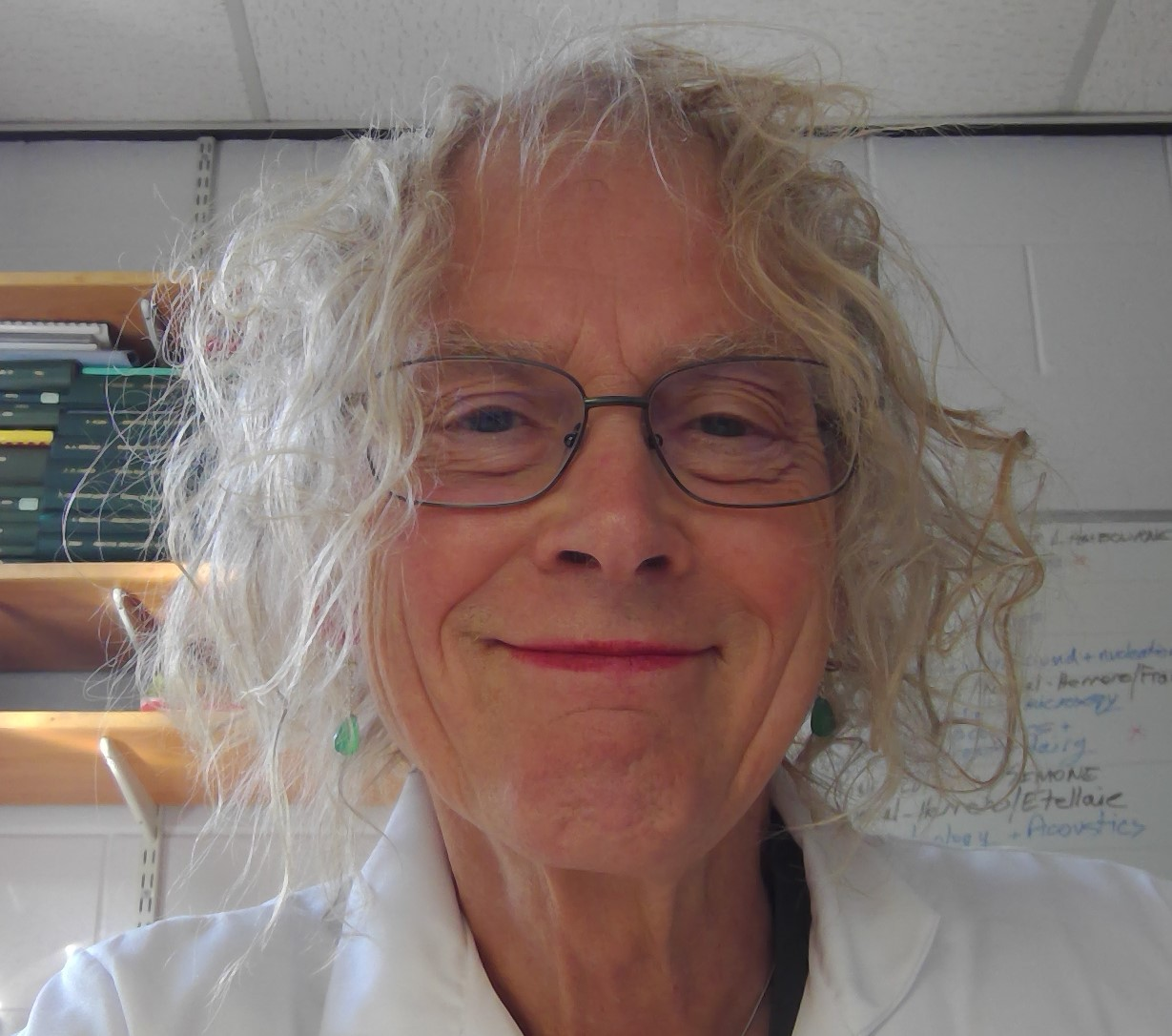
- Megan Povey in June 2025
- Born: Malcolm J. W. Povey
- Citizenship: England
- Education: University of Lancaster
- Scientific career
- Fields: Food physics, ultrasound and acoustics research
- Workplaces: University of Leeds

Megan J. Povey (died 9 September 2026) was an English food physicist and a professor at the University of Leeds. She was also a Fellow of the Institute of Physics and founding member of the Physics in Food Manufacturing group.

== Early life and education ==
Povey earned her bachelor's degree in physics at Lancaster University. As a student in the 1960s, Povey became involved with political activism, campaigning against nuclear power and being part of Unite Against Fascism. Her doctoral thesis was The Electromagnetic Generation of Ultrasonics in Ferromagnetic Metals (1973) and involved work of military potential; she was offered several research and development positions in defence contractors. Povey was not interested in these careers; being anti-war and pro civil rights, and pursued an academic career at the University of Leeds.

== Research and career ==
Povey joined the School of Food Science at the University of Leeds as a postdoctoral researcher in the 1970s. There she started studying the physics of food, developing new methods to use ultrasound and acoustics in both food characterisation and manufacture. Her work has helped highlight the importance of sound in the way that people enjoy food.

She also studied the crystallisation and growth of fat. Her research combined computational and mathematical modelling to develop both food and equipment.

Povey studied the physical processes that underpin digestion, in an attempt to develop foods that can be digested by older people.

Povey served as president of the University of Leeds University and College Union (UCU). She was a member of Scientists for Global Responsibility.

== Personal life ==
Povey was a transgender woman. In 2017, she came out to her family and colleagues and transitioned from Malcolm to Megan.

== Selected publications ==
- Zhang, Lingling; Jiang, Yunhong; Ding, Yulong; Povey, MJ; York, David (10 October 2006). "Investigation into the antibacterial behaviour of suspensions of ZnO nanoparticles (ZnO nanofluids)". Journal of Nanoparticle Research. 9 (3): 479–489. doi:10.1007/s11051-006-9150-1. ISSN 1388-0764. S2CID 97934211.
- Xiaobo, Zou; Jiewen, Zhao; Povey, M. J. W.; Holmes, Mel; Hanpin, Mao (14 May 2010). "Variables selection methods in near-infrared spectroscopy". Analytica Chimica Acta. 667 (1): 14–32. Bibcode:2010AcAC..667...14X. doi:10.1016/j.aca.2010.03.048. ISSN 0003-2670. PMID 20441862.</ref>
- Povey, M. J. W. (1997). Ultrasonic techniques for fluids characterization. Academic Press. ISBN 0-12-563730-6. OCLC 36713069.
