= Megan Pullum =

British-born Guernsey lawyer

- Born: 1971 (age 54–55)
- Education: University of Nantes; Cardiff University; University of Glamorgan
- Occupation: Lawyer

Megan Pullum, KC is a British-born lawyer practising in Guernsey who has been HM Procureur and Receiver General (Attorney-General) on the island since 2016.

== Career ==
Pullum was born in the United Kingdom, the daughter of Dr Geoffrey Pullum and his wife Anne. She was educated at Hertfordshire and Essex High School for Girls, before attending the University of Nantes in France, which awarded her a Diplôme d'études universitaires générales in 1992. The following year, she graduated with a law degree (LLB) in Law and French from the University of Wales College of Cardiff. After studying at the College of Law in York, in 1996 she was admitted a solicitor. She completed a master's degree in law (LLM) at the University of Glamorgan in 2000 and five years later, the University of Caen awarded her a Certificat d’études juridiques françaises et normandes.

In 2006, Pullum was called to the Guernsey Bar and six years later she was appointed Queen's Counsel in the Bailiwick. In 2012, she replaced Richard McMahon as HM Comptroller of Guernsey after he became Deputy Bailiff in place of Richard Collas, who became Bailiff. She was the first woman to hold a Crown officer's position on the island. In 2016, she replaced Howard Roberts as HM Procureur and Receiver General for Guernsey.
