= Next Level Chef (American TV series) season 1 =

Next Level Chef
- Season 1
- Promotional poster for season 1, featuring host Ramsay
- Starring: Nyesha Arrington; Richard Blais
- Hosted by: Gordon Ramsay
- No. of contestants: 15
- Winner: Stephanie "Pyet" Despain
- Runners-up: Mariah Scott; Reuel Vincent
- No. of episodes: 11

Release
- Original network: Fox
- Original release: January 2 – March 2, 2022

Season chronology
- Next → Season 2

The first season of the American competitive reality television series Next Level Chef premiered on Fox on January 2, 2022, and concluded on March 2, 2022. Gordon Ramsay hosted the season and served as a mentor, along with mentors Nyesha Arrington and Richard Blais.

The season was won by social media chef Stephanie "Pyet" Despain, with professional chefs Mariah Scott and Reuel Vincent finishing as co-runner-ups.

== Production ==
The series was first ordered on May 17, 2021. On October 19, 2021, it was announced that the season would premiere on January 2, 2022, before moving to its regular timeslot on January 5, 2022. A new episode was also aired on January 30, following the NFC Championship Game between the Los Angeles Rams and the San Francisco 49ers.

== Chefs ==
Contestant	Age	Status	Hometown/Home country	Result
Gary Marandola	33	Social media chef	Johnston, Rhode Island	Eliminated January 5
Roice Bethel	29	Social media chef	Corona, California	Eliminated January 12
Sergio Steele	26	Professional chef	Trinidad and Tobago	Eliminated January 19
Devonnie Black	31	Home cook	Bronx, New York	Eliminated January 26
Amber Rebold	33	Home cook	San Antonio, Texas	Eliminated January 30
Jonathan Harrison	29	Home cook	Columbiana, Alabama	Eliminated February 2
Zachary Adams	27	Professional chef	Manila, Philippines	Eliminated February 2
Ae Southammavong	31	Social media chef	Laos	Eliminated February 9
Tricia Wang	28	Social media chef	China	Eliminated February 16
Courtney Brown	48	Home cook	Cincinnati, Ohio	Eliminated February 23
Angie Ragan	47	Home cook	Lubbock, Texas	Eliminated February 23
Kenny Everett	34	Professional chef	St Louis, Missouri	Eliminated February 23
Mariah Scott	37	Professional chef	Santa Clara, California	Runner-ups March 2
Reuel Vincent	34	Professional chef	Trinidad and Tobago	Runner-ups March 2
Stephanie "Pyet" Despain	30	Social media chef	Kansas City, Kansas	Winner March 2

== Elimination table ==
Place	Contestant	Episodes										
Place	Contestant	1	2	3	4	5	6	7	8	9	10	11
1	Pyet	Arr	Safe	Safe	Safe	Win^{†}	Safe	Safe	Risk	Safe	Win	Winner
2	Mariah	Blais	Safe	Win	Safe	Safe	Risk	Safe	Win	Win	Win	Runner-up
2	Reuel	Ram	Win^{†}	Safe	Win	Safe	Win^{†}	Safe	Win	Risk	Risk	Runner-up
4	Courtney	Blais	Safe	Win	Risk	Safe	Safe	Win	Safe	Safe	Elim	
4	Angie	Arr	Safe	Safe	Safe	Win	Safe	Safe	Safe	Win	Elim	
4	Kenny	Ram	Win	Safe	Win	Safe	Win	Safe	Risk	Risk	Elim	
7	Tricia	Ram	Win	Safe	Win^{†}	Safe	Win	Safe	Safe	Elim		
8	Ae	Blais	Safe	Win	Safe	Safe	Safe	Risk	Elim			
9	Jonathan	Blais	Safe	Win^{†}	Safe	Risk	Safe	Elim				
9	Zach	Arr	Safe	Risk	Safe	Win	Safe	Elim				
11	Amber	Arr	Risk	Safe	Safe	Win	Elim					
12	Devonnie	Ram	Win	Safe	Win	Elim						
13	Sergio	Arr	Safe	Safe	Elim							
14	Roice	Ram	Win	Elim								
15	Gary	Blais	Elim									

^{†}The contestant cooked the best dish overall and won safety for their team or themselves.

The contestant was on the winning team or had the winning dish. For episodes 8 and 9, this contestant was assigned to the top kitchen the following episode.
The contestant was not on the winning team nor had the winning dish, but was not chosen for the head-to-head cook-off. For episodes 8 and 9, this contestant was assigned to the middle kitchen the following episode.
The contestant was at risk of elimination and won the head-to-head cook-off. For episodes 8 and 9, this contestant was assigned to the bottom kitchen the following episode.
The contestant was drafted to Gordon Ramsay's team.
The contestant was drafted to Nyesha Arrington's team.
The contestant was drafted to Richard Blais' team.
The contestant was eliminated from the competition.

== Episodes ==
No. overall	No. in season	Title	Original release date	Prod. code	U.S. viewers (millions)
1	1	"Welcome to the Next Level"	January 2, 2022	NLC-101	5.08
The fifteen chefs arrive at the studio in Las Vegas and meet the three mentors for the first time. Upon arrival, they were divided into three teams of five and must choose one of three keycards located near the elevator. Each team was assigned one of the three kitchens stacked on top of each other and cooked their first dishes. Challenge: Create a dish that identifies the chef's strengths and weaknesses. After the challenge, the three mentors taste the chefs' dishes for the first time and decide who is in their teams. The results for the mentors' teams were announced and each chef was drafted to one of the three mentors' teams for the rest of the season.: Team Ramsay: Devonnie, Kenny, Reuel, Roice, and Tricia; Team Arrington: Amber, Angie, Pyet, Sergio, and Zach; Team Blais: Ae, Courtney, Gary, Jonathan, and Mariah
2	2	"High Steaks"	January 5, 2022	NLC-102	1.84
The fifteen chefs return to the studio as members of the mentors' teams. The mentors' teams compete in a challenge that determines the best dish and sends two chefs to the head-to-head cook-off for the first time. Each mentor's team was assigned one of the three kitchens for the first time and cooked dishes for their mentors. Challenge: Create a dish that consists of steak and other available ingredients. After the challenge, the three mentors taste the chefs' dishes and decide whose dish is the best of the challenge. The team with the best dish of the challenge is immune from elimination. Team Ramsay's Reuel cooked the best dish of the challenge, winning safety for the team. Shortly after, Nyesha Arrington and Richard Blais were forced to send Amber and Gary to the head-to-head cook-off, where one of them would be eliminated. Head-to-Head Cook-Off: Create a dish inspired by wine. At the end of the cook-off, the three mentors taste Amber and Gary's dishes and decide who would remain in the competition. Amber won the head-to-head cook-off and remained in the competition. Gary was eliminated from the competition and finished in fifteenth (last) place.
3	3	"Infinite Pastabilities"	January 12, 2022	NLC-103	1.91
The fourteen remaining chefs return to the studio to prepare for a challenge that would be based on a national cuisine for the first time. Unlike the previous challenge, the mentors' teams switched kitchens for the first time and cooked dishes for their mentors. Challenge: Create an Italian dish that consists of available ingredients. After the challenge, the three mentors taste the chefs' dishes and decide whose dish is the best of the challenge. Team Blais' Jonathan cooked the best dish of the challenge, winning safety for the team. Shortly after, Gordon Ramsay and Nyesha Arrington were forced to send Roice and Zach to the head-to-head cook-off, where one of them would be eliminated. Head-to-Head Cook-Off: Create noodles from outside of Italy with other available ingredients. At the end of the cook-off, the three mentors taste Roice and Zach's dishes and decide who would remain in the competition. Zach won the head-to-head cook-off and remained in the competition. Roice was eliminated from the competition and finished in fourteenth place.
4	4	"Fowl Play"	January 19, 2022	NLC-104	1.85
The thirteen remaining chefs return to the studio to cook poultry dishes. The chefs, once again, switched kitchens and cooked for their mentors. Challenge: Create a poultry dish that consists of available ingredients. After the challenge, the three mentors taste the chefs' dishes and decide whose dish is the best of the challenge. Team Ramsay's Tricia cooked the best dish of the challenge, winning safety for the team. Shortly after, Nyesha Arrington and Richard Blais were forced to send Sergio and Courtney to the head-to-head cook-off, where one of them would be eliminated. Head-to-Head Cook-Off: Create a chicken and truffles dish with other available ingredients. At the end of the cook-off, the three mentors taste Sergio and Courtney's dishes and decide who would remain in the competition. Courtney won the head-to-head cook-off and remained in the competition. Sergio was eliminated from the competition and finished in thirteenth place.
5	5	"The Next Level Burger"	January 26, 2022	NLC-105	2.07
The twelve remaining chefs go on a field trip to Gordon Ramsay Burger, a restaurant located inside Planet Hollywood Las Vegas. Once they enter the restaurant, the three mentors introduce a challenge that would be based on a specific restaurant's dish for the first time. The chefs taste the restaurant's burgers and return to the studio to start cooking their own burgers. Challenge: Create a burger that consists of available ingredients. After the challenge, the three mentors taste the chefs' burgers and decide whose burger is the best. Team Arrington's Pyet cooked the best burger, winning safety for the team. Shortly after, Gordon Ramsay and Richard Blais were forced to send Devonnie and Jonathan to the head-to-head cook-off, where one of them would be eliminated. Head-to-Head Cook-Off: Cook an ahi tuna burger with slaw and onion rings. At the end of the cook-off, the three mentors taste Devonnie and Jonathan's dishes and decide who would remain in the competition. Jonathan won the head-to-head cook-off and remained in the competition. Devonnie was eliminated from the competition and finished in twelfth place.
6	6	"Drop In for Brunch"	January 30, 2022	NLC-106	8.11
The eleven remaining chefs return to the studio to prepare for a challenge that combines two main meals for the first time. Like the previous challenge, the mentors' teams switched kitchens and cooked dishes for their mentors. Challenge: Create a brunch dish that consists of available ingredients and incorporates sweet and savory elements. After the challenge, the three mentors taste the chefs' dishes and decide whose dish is the best of the challenge. Team Ramsay's Reuel cooked the best dish of the challenge for the second time, winning safety for the team. Shortly after, Nyesha Arrington and Richard Blais were forced to send Amber and Mariah to the head-to-head cook-off, where one of them would be eliminated. Head-to-Head Cook-Off: Create a coffee-infused dish. At the end of the cook-off, the three mentors taste Amber and Mariah's dishes and decide who would remain in the competition. Mariah won the head-to-head cook-off and remained in the competition. Amber was eliminated from the competition and finished in eleventh place.
7	7	"A Seafood Tower"	February 2, 2022	NLC-107	2.11
The ten remaining chefs return to the studio to prepare for a challenge that has different rules for the first time. Unlike the previous challenges, only the chef with the best dish of the challenge is immune from elimination and the three chefs with the worst dishes of the challenge would be sent to the head-to-head cook-off. The chefs understood the rules and cooked dishes for their mentors. Challenge: Create a seafood dish that consists of available ingredients. After the challenge, the three mentors taste the chefs' dishes and decide whose dish is the best of the challenge. Team Blais' Courtney cooked the best dish of the challenge and won safety. Shortly after, Richard Blais sent Ae and Jonathan to the head-to-head cook-off while Nyesha Arrington sent Zach to the head-to-head cook-off. Head-to-Head Cook-Off: Create a shrimp with other available ingredients. At the end of the cook-off, the three mentors taste Ae, Jonathan, and Zach's dishes and decide who would remain in the competition. Ae won the head-to-head cook-off and remained in the competition. Jonathan and Zach were eliminated from the competition and finished in ninth and tenth place, respectively.
8	8	"When Pigs Fly"	February 9, 2022	NLC-108	1.75
The eight remaining chefs return to the studio to prepare for changes. For the rest of the season, the mentors' teams disbanded, making each remaining chef compete against each other. Kitchens would be assigned based on the chefs' overall performances in the previous challenge(s), making the worst chefs cook in the bottom kitchen. The chefs understood the changes and cooked dishes for themselves. Challenge: Create a dish that consists of pork and other available ingredients. After the challenge, the three mentors taste the chefs' dishes and assign kitchens for the next challenge based on the chefs' performances. The chefs assigned above the bottom kitchen are safe while the chefs assigned in the bottom kitchen would be sent to the head-to-head cook-off. Ae, Kenny, and Pyet were sent to the head-to-head cook-off after being assigned in the bottom kitchen. Head-to-Head Cook-Off: Create a dish that consists of bacon and other available ingredients. At the end of the cook-off, the three mentors taste Ae, Kenny, and Pyet's dishes and decide who would be eliminated. Kenny and Pyet won the head-to-head cook-off and remained in the competition. Ae was eliminated from the competition and finished in eighth place.
9	9	"Fusion Confusion"	February 16, 2022	NLC-109	1.88
The seven remaining chefs return to the studio for the last challenge before the semi-finals. Unlike the previous challenge, the top kitchen became available for use by Mariah and Reuel, who were assigned in that kitchen for their best performances in the previous challenge. The chefs went to their assigned kitchens based on their overall performances and cooked dishes for themselves. Challenge: Create a dish that consists of ingredients from two different countries. After the challenge, the three mentors taste the chefs' dishes and assign kitchens for the semi-finals based on the chefs' performances. Angie, Courtney, Mariah, and Pyet automatically moved on to the semi-finals after being safe from elimination. Kenny, Reuel, and Tricia were sent to the head-to-head cook-off after being assigned in the bottom kitchen. Head-to-Head Cook-Off: Create a dish that consists of Korean and American-Southern ingredients. At the end of the cook-off, the three mentors taste Kenny, Reuel, and Tricia's dishes and decide who would be eliminated. Kenny and Reuel won the head-to-head cook-off and moved on to the semi-finals. Tricia was eliminated from the competition and finished in seventh place.
10	10	"Show Stopping Semi-Finals"	February 23, 2022	NLC-110	1.89
The six semi-finalists return to the studio for the semi-finals. Unlike the previous challenges, the semi-finalists use every skill they learned since the first challenge to create a dish. The three mentors reveal their own dishes to prove they have outstanding cooking skills. The semi-finalists went to their assigned kitchens and cooked dishes for themselves. Challenge: Create a dish that showcases the semi-finalist's skills. After the challenge, the three mentors taste the semi-finalists' dishes and decide which two dishes are the best. The two semi-finalists with the best dishes of the challenge would automatically move on to the finale. Mariah and Pyet became the first two finalists after cooking the best dishes. The other four semi-finalists were sent to the last head-to-head cook-off of the season after failing to impress the mentors. Head-to-Head Cook-Off: Create a dish that is worth for the finale. At the end of the cook-off, the three mentors taste the four semi-finalists' dishes and decide the last finalist of the season. Reuel became the last finalist of the season after winning the head-to-head cook-off. Courtney, Angie, and Kenny were eliminated from the competition and finished in fourth, fifth, and sixth place, respectively.
11	11	"The Final Level"	March 2, 2022	NLC-111	1.85
The three finalists return to the studio for the finale. In the final challenge, the three finalists create a three-course meal that showcases their cooking skills. Unlike other challenges, there is no time limit for each course, making each finalist press the button every time they finish cooking. Each finalist must finish the meal in less than 90 minutes and cook each course in a different kitchen. Before the final challenge, each finalist's family visited the studio to support the three finalists.: Bottom Kitchen: Create an appetizer that consists of available ingredients.; Middle Kitchen: Create a seafood dish that consists of available ingredients.; Top Kitchen: Create an entrée that consists of meat and other available ingredients.; After cooking each course, the three mentors taste the three finalists' dishes as they progress throughout the final challenge. After tasting the final course, the three mentors decide the winner of the season. The finalist with the best meal of the final challenge would win the season. Pyet was announced as the winner of the season for her outstanding cooking skills.

== Ratings ==
Viewership and ratings per episode of Next Level Chef (American TV series) season 1
No.	Title	Air date	Timeslot (ET)	Rating/share (18–49)	Viewers (millions)	DVR (18–49)	DVR viewers (millions)	Total (18–49)	Total viewers (millions)	Ref.
1	"Welcome to the Next Level"	January 2, 2022	Sunday 8:00 p.m.	1.6/9	5.08	0.2	0.68	1.7	5.76	(Note: Live+7 ratings were unavailable, so Live+3 ratings have been used instead.)
2	"High Steaks"	January 5, 2022	Wednesday 9:00 p.m.	0.5/3	1.84	0.2	0.89	0.7	2.73	
3	"Infinite Pastabilities"	January 12, 2022	Wednesday 9:00 p.m.	0.5/4	1.91	—N/a	—N/a	—N/a	—N/a	
4	"Fowl Play"	January 19, 2022	Wednesday 9:00 p.m.	0.5/4	1.85	0.1	0.75	0.6	2.61	
5	"The Next Level Burger"	January 26, 2022	Wednesday 9:00 p.m.	0.5/3	2.07	0.3	0.91	0.7	2.98	
6	"Drop In for Brunch"	January 30, 2022	Sunday 10:00 p.m.	2.6/19	8.11	—N/a	—N/a	—N/a	—N/a	
7	"A Seafood Tower"	February 2, 2022	Wednesday 9:00 p.m.	0.5/4	2.11	—N/a	—N/a	—N/a	—N/a	
8	"When Pigs Fly"	February 9, 2022	Wednesday 9:00 p.m.	0.4/3	1.75	—N/a	—N/a	—N/a	—N/a	
9	"Fusion Confusion"	February 16, 2022	Wednesday 9:00 p.m.	0.4/3	1.88	—N/a	—N/a	—N/a	—N/a	
10	"Show Stopping Semi-Finals"	February 23, 2022	Wednesday 9:00 p.m.	0.4/3	1.89	0.2	0.85	0.7	2.73	
11	"The Final Level"	March 2, 2022	Wednesday 9:00 p.m.	0.4/4	1.85	0.2	0.85	0.6	2.70	
