= Next Level Chef (American TV series) season 3 =

Next Level Chef
- Season 3
- Promotional poster for season 3, featuring host Ramsay
- Starring: Nyesha Arrington; Richard Blais
- Hosted by: Gordon Ramsay
- No. of contestants: 24 (before auditions) & 15 (after auditions)
- Winner: Gabi Chappel
- Runners-up: Christina Miros; Zach Laidlaw
- No. of episodes: 16

Release
- Original network: Fox
- Original release: January 28 – May 9, 2024

Season chronology
- ← Previous; Season 2 Next → Season 4

The third season of the American competitive reality television series Next Level Chef premiered on Fox on January 28, 2024, as the 2023 NFC Championship Game lead-out program, and concluded on May 9, 2024. Gordon Ramsay returned to host the season and served as a mentor, along with returning mentors Nyesha Arrington and Richard Blais.

The season was won by social media chef Gabi Chappel, with home cook Christina Miros and professional chef Zach Laidlaw being named runners-up.

== Production ==
On May 11, 2023, it was announced that the series was renewed for the third and fourth seasons, prior to the airing of the second season finale on the same day. On November 21, 2023, it was announced that the season would premiere on January 28, 2024, before moving to its regular timeslot on February 1, 2024. The program aired on Thursday nights, with a Sunday rebroadcast from February 11, 2024, that Fox used to burn off in case of NASCAR overrun.

== Chefs ==
Note: The list below only includes chefs that made it onto the show after qualifying via an audition.

Contestant	Age	Status	Hometown/Home country	Result
Matt Auckland	22	Social media chef	Ingleside, Illinois	Eliminated February 15
Arceli “Ari” Pulido	31	Professional chef	San Diego, California	Eliminated February 22
Wendy Bess Chiu	26	Home cook	Sunnyvale, California	Eliminated February 29
Alexandra Donnadio	29	Home cook	Hillsborough Township, New Jersey	Eliminated March 7
Lauren Smith	36	Home cook	Santa Monica, California	Eliminated March 14
Chris Tzorin	37	Professional chef	Orange County, California	Eliminated March 21
Angela Pagan	33	Professional chef	Atlanta, Georgia	Eliminated March 28
Ryan “Von” Smith	37	Professional chef	Scranton, Pennsylvania	Eliminated April 4
Nicole Renard	28	Social media chef	Kennewick, Washington	Eliminated April 11
Mada Abdelhamid	36	Home cook	Los Angeles, California	Eliminated April 18
Izahya Thomas	24	Social media chef	Miami, Florida	Eliminated April 25
Jordan Torrey	29	Social media chef	Tampa, Florida	Eliminated May 2
Christina Miros	35	Home cook	Dumont, New Jersey	Runners-up May 9
Zach Laidlaw	34	Professional chef	Maui, Hawai'i	Runners-up May 9
Gabi Chappel	29	Social media chef	Brooklyn, New York	Winner May 9

== Elimination table ==
Place	Contestant	Episodes																
Place	Contestant	1	2	3	4		5	6	7	8	9	10	11	12	13	14	15	16
1	Gabi	Adv			Ram	Safe	Win	Safe	Safe	Win^{†}	Safe	Win^{†}	Safe	Risk	Win	Win^{†}	Win	Winner
2	Christina		Adv		Arr	Win*	Safe	Win	Safe	Safe	Safe	Risk	Safe	Win	Win^{†}	Safe	Win	Runner-up
2	Zach			Adv	Blais	Safe*	Safe	Safe	Win^{†}	Safe	Win	Safe	Win^{†}	Safe	Risk	Safe	Risk	Runner-up
4	Jordan	Adv			Ram	Safe*	Win	Safe	Risk	Win	Safe	Win	Risk	Safe	Safe	Risk	Elim	
5	Izahya	Adv			Ram	Safe	Win^{†}	Safe	Safe	Win	Safe	Win	Safe	Risk	Risk	Elim		
6	Mada		Adv		Arr	Win	Safe	Win	Safe	Risk	Risk	Safe	Safe	Win^{†}	Elim			
7	Nicole	Adv			Blais	Safe	Safe	Safe	Win	Safe	Win^{†}	Safe	Win^{†}	Elim				
8	Von			Adv	Arr	Win^{†}	Safe	Win^{†}	Safe	Safe	Safe	Safe	Elim					
9	Angela			Adv	Blais	Safe	Safe	Risk	Win	Safe	Win	Elim						
10	Chris			Adv	Ram	Risk	Win	Safe	Safe	Win	Elim							
11	Lauren		Adv		Blais	Safe	Risk	Safe	Win	Elim								
12	Alexandra		Adv		Arr	Win	Safe	Win	Elim									
13	Wendy		Adv		Ram	Safe	Win	Elim										
14	Ari			Adv	Arr	Win	Elim											
15	Matt	Adv			Blais	Elim												
T-16	Charity			Elim														
T-16	Joe		Elim															
T-16	Brittnee	Elim																
T-19	Summer			Elim														
T-19	Monika		Elim															
T-19	Tim	Elim																
T-22	Jennie			Elim														
T-22	Daniel		Elim															
T-22	Brittany	Elim																

^{†}The contestant cooked the best dish overall and won safety for their team or themselves.

*The contestant cooked the best dish on their team and was selected by their mentor to win an immunity pin.

The contestant advanced to the team draft.
The contestant was on the winning team or had the winning dish.
The contestant was not on the winning team nor had the winning dish, but was not chosen for the head-to-head cook-off.
The contestant was safe due to using their immunity pin and did not compete in the head-to-head cook-off.
The contestant was at risk of elimination and won the head-to-head cook-off.
The contestant was drafted to Gordon Ramsay's team.
The contestant was drafted to Nyesha Arrington's team.
The contestant was drafted to Richard Blais' team.
The contestant was eliminated from the competition.
The contestant was eliminated during the auditions.

== Episodes ==
No. overall	No. in season	Title	Original release date	Prod. code	U.S. viewers (millions)
27	1	"Auditions - Social Media"	January 28, 2024	NLC-302	7.24
28	2	"Auditions - Home Cooks"	February 1, 2024	NLC-303	2.03
29	3	"Auditions - Pros"	February 8, 2024	NLC-301	2.11
30	4	"The Draft/Smash Bash"	February 15, 2024	NLC-304	2.09
31	5	"Curry in a Hurry"	February 22, 2024	NLC-305	1.93
32	6	"80 Degrees and Palm Trees"	February 29, 2024	NLC-306	2.02
33	7	"On the Go"	March 7, 2024	NLC-307	1.86
34	8	"Don't Have a Cow, Man"	March 14, 2024	NLC-308	1.76
35	9	"You Wanna Pizza Me?"	March 21, 2024	NLC-309	1.82
36	10	"It's All Greek to Me"	March 28, 2024	NLC-310	1.72
37	11	"Squad Goals"	April 4, 2024	NLC-311	1.93
38	12	"Bingo, Bango, Bento!"	April 11, 2024	NLC-312	1.82
39	13	"Picture Perfect"	April 18, 2024	NLC-313	1.98
40	14	"Kombucha Kulture"	April 25, 2024	NLC-314	1.79
41	15	"Taste of Success"	May 2, 2024	NLC-315	1.72
42	16	"The Final Level"	May 9, 2024	NLC-316	1.76

== Ratings ==
Viewership and ratings per episode of Next Level Chef (American TV series) season 3
No.	Title	Air date	Timeslot (ET)	Rating/share (18–49)	Viewers (millions)	DVR (18–49)	DVR viewers (millions)	Total (18–49)	Total viewers (millions)	Ref.
1	"Auditions - Social Media"	January 28, 2024	Sunday 10:00 p.m.	2.2	7.24	TBD	TBD	TBD	TBD	
2	"Auditions - Home Cooks"	February 1, 2024	Thursday 8:00 p.m.	0.4	2.03	TBD	TBD	TBD	TBD	
3	"Auditions - Pros"	February 8, 2024	Thursday 8:00 p.m.	0.4	2.11	TBD	TBD	TBD	TBD	
4	"The Draft/Smash Bash"	February 15, 2024	Thursday 8:00 p.m.	0.4	2.09	TBD	TBD	TBD	TBD	
5	"Curry in a Hurry"	February 22, 2024	Thursday 8:00 p.m.	0.3	1.93	TBD	TBD	TBD	TBD	
6	"80 Degrees and Palm Trees"	February 29, 2024	Thursday 8:00 p.m.	0.3	2.02	TBD	TBD	TBD	TBD	
7	"On the Go"	March 7, 2024	Thursday 8:00 p.m.	0.4	1.86	TBD	TBD	TBD	TBD	
8	"Don't Have a Cow, Man"	March 14, 2024	Thursday 8:00 p.m.	0.3	1.76	0.2	0.89	0.5	2.65	
9	"You Wanna Pizza Me?"	March 21, 2024	Thursday 8:00 p.m.	0.3	1.82	TBD	TBD	TBD	TBD	
10	"It's All Greek to Me"	March 28, 2024	Thursday 8:00 p.m.	0.3	1.72	TBD	TBD	TBD	TBD	
11	"Squad Goals"	April 4, 2024	Thursday 8:00 p.m.	0.3	1.93	TBD	TBD	TBD	TBD	
12	"Bingo, Bango, Bento!"	April 11, 2024	Thursday 8:00 p.m.	0.3	1.82	TBD	TBD	TBD	TBD	
13	"Picture Perfect"	April 18, 2024	Thursday 8:00 p.m.	0.4	1.98	TBD	TBD	TBD	TBD	
14	"Kombucha Kulture"	April 25, 2024	Thursday 8:00 p.m.	0.3	1.79	TBD	TBD	TBD	TBD	
15	"Taste of Success"	May 2, 2024	Thursday 8:00 p.m.	0.3	1.72	TBD	TBD	TBD	TBD	
16	"The Final Level"	May 9, 2024	Thursday 8:00 p.m.	0.3	1.76	TBD	TBD	TBD	TBD	
