= Next Level Chef (American TV series) season 4 =

Season of television series

Next Level Chef
- Season 4
- Promotional poster for season 4, featuring (L to R) mentor Arrington, host Ramsay, and mentor Blais
- Starring: Nyesha Arrington; Richard Blais
- Hosted by: Gordon Ramsay
- No. of contestants: 24 (before auditions) & 15 (after auditions)
- Winner: Austin Beckett
- Runners-up: Beatrice Heirigs; Megan Keno
- No. of episodes: 14

Release
- Original network: Fox
- Original release: February 13 – May 15, 2025

Season chronology
- ← Previous; Season 3 Next → Season 5

The fourth season of the American competitive reality television series Next Level Chef premiered on February 13, 2025, and concluded on May 15, 2025. Gordon Ramsay returned as host and mentor, and Nyesha Arrington and Richard Blais returned as mentors.

The season was won by professional chef Austin Beckett, with professional chef Beatrice Heirigs and home cook Megan Keno being named runners-up.

== Production ==
On May 11, 2023, it was announced that the series was renewed for the third and fourth seasons, prior to the airing of the second season finale on the same day. In January 2025, it was announced that the season would premiere on February 13, 2025.

== Chefs ==
Note: The list below only includes chefs that made it onto the show after qualifying via an audition.

Contestant	Age	Status	Hometown/Home country	Result
Mistie Knight	41	Social media chef	Las Vegas, Nevada	Eliminated March 6
Cathy Cann	30	Home cook	Stratford, Connecticut	Eliminated March 13
Meg Sheley	33	Social media chef	Minneapolis, Minnesota	Withdrew March 20
Maryam Ishtiaq	31	Home cook	Dallas, Texas	Eliminated March 20
Jeff Kim	35	Social media chef	Fountain Valley, California	Eliminated March 27
Iman Kawa	35	Professional chef	New York, New York	Eliminated April 3
Natalia Gutierrez	28	Home cook	Los Angeles, California	Eliminated April 10
Becca Guevara	27	Social media chef	Denver, Colorado	Eliminated April 17
Arnav Kamulkar	19	Home cook	Ithaca, New York	Eliminated April 24
Ryan Scanlon	22	Professional chef	Boston, Massachusetts	Eliminated May 1
Bobby Hicks	38	Social media chef	Coconut Creek, Florida	Eliminated May 8
Brandon Rogers	36	Professional chef	Chicago, Illinois	Eliminated May 8
Megan Keno	37	Home cook	Auburn, Washington	Runners-up May 15
Beatrice Heirigs	18	Professional chef	Flagstaff, Arizona	Runners-up May 15
Austin Beckett	30	Professional chef	Freeburg, Illinois	Winner May 15

== Elimination table ==
Place	Contestant	Episodes														
Place	Contestant	1	2	3	4		5	6	7	8	9	10	11	12	13	14
1	Austin			Adv	Blais	Risk	Safe	Safe	Safe	Win	Win	Safe	Win	Safe	Win	Winner
2	Megan		Adv		Blais	Safe	Safe	Safe	Safe	Win	Risk	Safe	Win^{†}	Risk	Risk	Runner-up
2	Beatrice			Adv	Ram	Safe	Win^{†}	Win^{†}	Win	Risk	Win	Win^{†}	Safe	Safe	Win	Runner-up
T-4	Brandon			Adv	Blais	Safe	Risk	Safe	Safe	Win^{†}	Risk	Safe	Risk	Win^{†}	Elim	
T-4	Bobby	Adv			Arr	Win^{†}*	Safe	Safe	Risk	Safe	Win	Win	Risk	Win	Elim	
6	Ryan			Adv	Ram	Safe*	Win	Win	Win	Safe	Risk	Risk	Safe	Elim		
7	Arnav		Adv		Ram	Safe	Win	Win	Win	Safe	Win	Risk	Elim			
8	Becca	Adv			Arr	Win	Safe	Safe	Safe	Safe	Win	Elim				
9	Natalia		Adv		Arr	Win	Safe	Safe	Safe	Safe	Elim					
10	Iman			Adv	Arr	Win	Safe	Risk	Safe	Elim						
11	Jeff	Adv			Blais	Safe*	Safe	Safe	Elim							
12	Maryam		Adv		Blais	Safe	Safe	Elim								
13	Meg	Adv			Ram	Safe	Win	WD								
14	Cathy		Adv		Arr	Win	Elim									
15	Mistie	Adv			Ram	Elim										
T-16	Brennan			Elim												
T-16	Jimmy		Elim													
T-16	Keith	Elim														
T-19	Ash			Elim												
T-19	Nick		Elim													
T-19	Jake	Elim														
T-22	Ashley			Elim												
T-22	Ruma		Elim													
T-22	llena	Elim														

^{†}The contestant cooked the best dish overall and won safety for their team or themselves.

*The contestant cooked the best dish on their team and was selected by their mentor to win an immunity pin.

The contestant advanced to the team draft.
The contestant was on the winning team or had the winning dish.
The contestant was not on the winning team nor had the winning dish, but was not chosen for the head-to-head cook-off.
The contestant was safe due to using their immunity pin and did not compete in the head-to-head cook-off.
The contestant was at risk of elimination and won the head-to-head cook-off.
The contestant was drafted to Gordon Ramsay's team.
The contestant was drafted to Nyesha Arrington's team.
The contestant was drafted to Richard Blais' team.
The contestant was eliminated from the competition.
The contestant was eliminated during the auditions.
The contestant withdrew from the competition.

== Episodes ==
No. overall	No. in season	Title	Original release date	Prod. code	U.S. viewers (millions)
43	1	"Social Media Chef Auditions"	February 13, 2025	NLC-401	1.83
44	2	"Home Chef Auditions"	February 20, 2025	NLC-402	1.71
45	3	"Pro Chef Auditions"	February 27, 2025	NLC-403	1.65
46	4	"Ciao Down"	March 6, 2025	NLC-404	1.69
47	5	"Grills Gone Wild"	March 13, 2025	NLC-405	1.60
48	6	"Shoyu my Ramen"	March 20, 2025	NLC-406	1.78
49	7	"The Menu"	March 27, 2025	NLC-407	1.71
50	8	"Beat the Heat"	April 3, 2025	NLC-408	1.68
51	9	"The Thunderdome"	April 10, 2025	NLC-409	1.75
52	10	"A Very Special O' Cajun"	April 17, 2025	NLC-410	1.94
53	11	"Tapas In"	April 24, 2025	NLC-411	1.61
54	12	"Bad to the Bone"	May 1, 2025	NLC-412	1.66
55	13	"Always Crust Your Instincts"	May 8, 2025	NLC-413	1.72
56	14	"Final Level"	May 15, 2025	NLC-414	1.70

== Ratings ==
Viewership and ratings per episode of Next Level Chef (American TV series) season 4
No.	Title	Air date	Rating/share (18–49)	Viewers (millions)	DVR (18–49)	DVR viewers (millions)	Total (18–49)	Total viewers (millions)	Ref.
1	"Social Media Chef Auditions"	February 13, 2025	0.3	1.83	TBD	TBD	TBD	TBD	
2	"Home Chef Auditions"	February 20, 2025	0.2	1.71	TBD	TBD	TBD	TBD	
3	"Pro Chef Auditions"	February 27, 2025	0.3	1.65	TBD	TBD	TBD	TBD	
4	"Ciao Down"	March 6, 2025	0.2	1.69	TBD	TBD	TBD	TBD	
5	"Grills Gone Wild"	March 13, 2025	0.2	1.60	TBD	TBD	TBD	TBD	
6	"Shoyu my Ramen"	March 20, 2025	0.3	1.78	TBD	TBD	TBD	TBD	
7	"The Menu"	March 27, 2025	0.3	1.71	TBD	TBD	TBD	TBD	
8	"Beat the Heat"	April 3, 2025	0.2	1.68	TBD	TBD	TBD	TBD	
9	"The Thunderdome"	April 10, 2025	0.3	1.75	TBD	TBD	TBD	TBD	
10	"A Very Special O' Cajun"	April 17, 2025	0.4	1.94	TBD	TBD	TBD	TBD	
11	"Tapas In"	April 24, 2025	0.2	1.61	TBD	TBD	TBD	TBD	
12	"Bad to the Bone"	May 1, 2025	0.2	1.66	TBD	TBD	TBD	TBD	
13	"Always Crust Your Instincts"	May 8, 2025	0.3	1.72	TBD	TBD	TBD	TBD	
14	"Final Level"	May 15, 2025	0.3	1.70	TBD	TBD	TBD	TBD	
