= Next Level Chef (American TV series) season 2 =

Next Level Chef
- Season 2
- Promotional poster for season 2, featuring host Ramsay
- Starring: Nyesha Arrington; Richard Blais
- Hosted by: Gordon Ramsay
- No. of contestants: 18
- Winner: Tucker Ricchio
- Runners-up: Pilar Omega; Christopher Spinosa
- No. of episodes: 15

Release
- Original network: Fox
- Original release: February 12 – May 11, 2023

Season chronology
- ← Previous; Season 1 Next → Season 3

The second season of the American competitive reality television series Next Level Chef premiered on Fox on February 12, 2023, as the Super Bowl LVII lead-out program, and concluded on May 11, 2023. Gordon Ramsay returned to host the season and served as a mentor, along with returning mentors Nyesha Arrington and Richard Blais.

The season was won by professional chef Tucker Ricchio, with professional chefs Pilar Omega and Christopher Spinosa finishing as co-runner-ups.

== Production ==
On March 2, 2022, it was announced that the series was renewed for a second season, prior to the airing of the first season's finale on the same day. On May 16, 2022, it was announced that the season would premiere on February 12, 2023, before moving to its regular timeslot on February 16, 2023.

== Chefs ==
Contestant	Age	Status	Hometown/Home country	Result
Kamahlai Stewart	41	Home cook	Washington D.C.	Eliminated February 12
Alex Morizio	48	Home cook	Brooklyn, New York	Eliminated February 16
Darryl Taylor	52	Professional chef	Memphis, Tennessee	Eliminated February 23
Mark McMillian	52	Home cook	Los Angeles, California	Eliminated March 2
Cassie Yeung	28	Social media chef	South Brunswick, New Jersey	Eliminated March 9
April Clayton	39	Home cook	Henderson, Tennessee	Eliminated March 16
Matt Groark	44	Social media chef	Erial, New Jersey	Eliminated March 23
Preston Nguyen	19	Professional chef	Dallas, Texas	Eliminated March 30
Vincent "Vinny" Alia	42	Home cook	Columbia, South Carolina	Eliminated April 6
Shay Spence	32	Social media chef	Austin, Texas	Eliminated April 13
Tineke "Tini" Younger	20	Social media chef	Frederick, Maryland	Eliminated April 20
Michelle Calcagni	30	Home cook	Oradell, New Jersey	Eliminated April 27
Mehreen Karim	27	Home cook	Auburn, Alabama	Eliminated May 4
Nuri Muhammad	22	Professional chef	Bowie, Maryland	Eliminated May 11
Omallys "Omi" Hopper	39	Social media chef	Río Grande, Puerto Rico	Eliminated May 11
Christopher "Chris" Spinosa	29	Professional chef	Long Island, New York	Runner-ups May 11
Pilar Omega	38	Professional chef	Detroit, Michigan	Runner-ups May 11
Tucker Ricchio	31	Professional chef	San Jose, California	Winner May 11

== Elimination table ==
Place	Contestant	Episodes															
Place	Contestant	1		2	3	4	5	6	7	8	9	10	11	12	13	14	15
1	Tucker	Ram	Win^{†}*	Safe	Safe	Safe	Safe	Win	Safe	Win	Win	Win	Risk	Safe	Win	Win	Winner
2	Chris	Blais	Safe	Win	Safe	Risk	Win	Risk	Safe	Safe	Safe	Safe	Safe	Win	Safe	Risk	Runner-up
2	Pilar	Arr	Safe	Safe	Win	Win^{†}	Safe	Safe	Win	Risk	Safe	Win	Safe	Safe	Risk	Win	Runner-up
4	Nuri	Arr	Safe*	Safe	Win^{†}	Win	Safe	Safe	Win	Safe	Win	Risk	Risk	Risk	Safe	Elim	
4	Omi	Arr	Safe	Safe	Win	Win	Safe	Safe	Win^{†}	Win	Win	Risk	Safe	Win	Risk	Elim	
6	Mehreen	Blais	Safe	Win	Safe	Safe	Win^{†}	Safe	Safe	Safe	Risk	Safe	Win	Risk	Elim		
7	Michelle	Ram	Win	Safe	Safe	Safe	Safe	Win	Safe	Win	Safe	Safe	Win	Elim			
8	Tini	Blais	Safe	Win^{†}	Safe	Safe	Win	Safe	Safe	Safe	Risk	Safe	Elim				
9	Shay	Arr	Safe	Safe	Win	Win	Risk	Safe	Win	Safe	Win	Elim					
10	Vinny	Ram	Win	Safe	Risk	Safe	Safe	Win	Safe	Risk	Elim						
11	Preston	Ram	Win	Safe	Safe	Safe	Safe	Win^{†}	Risk	Elim							
12	Matt	Blais	Safe*	Win	Safe	Safe	Win	Safe	Elim								
13	April	Arr	Risk	Safe	Win	Win	Safe	Elim									
14	Cassie	Ram	Win	Risk	Safe	Safe	Elim										
15	Mark	Ram	Win	Safe	Safe	Elim											
16	Darryl	Blais	Safe	Win	Elim												
17	Alex	Arr	Safe	Elim													
18	Kamahlai	Blais	Elim														

^{†}The contestant cooked the best dish overall and won safety for their team or themselves.

*The contestant cooked the best dish on their team and was selected by their mentor to win an immunity pin.

The contestant was on the winning team or had the winning dish.
The contestant was not on the winning team nor had the winning dish, but was not chosen for the head-to-head cook-off.
The contestant was safe due to using their immunity pin and did not compete in the head-to-head cook-off.
The contestant was at risk of elimination and won the head-to-head cook-off.
The contestant was drafted to Gordon Ramsay's team.
The contestant was drafted to Nyesha Arrington's team.
The contestant was drafted to Richard Blais' team.
The contestant was eliminated from the competition.

== Episodes ==
No. overall	No. in season	Title	Original release date	Prod. code	U.S. viewers (millions)
12	1	"A Next Level Welcome"	February 12, 2023	NLC-201	15.66
13	2	"Party Like a Guac Star"	February 16, 2023	NLC-202	1.93
14	3	"No Pain, No Grain"	February 23, 2023	NLC-203	2.08
15	4	"Rice Guys Finish Last"	March 2, 2023	NLC-204	2.02
16	5	"Game Time"	March 9, 2023	NLC-205	1.80
17	6	"Sugar and Tea and Rum"	March 16, 2023	NLC-206	1.97
18	7	"Here Fishy, Fishy"	March 23, 2023	NLC-207	2.00
19	8	"Going Global"	March 30, 2023	NLC-208	1.80
20	9	"Happy Hour"	April 6, 2023	NLC-209	1.98
21	10	"That's What Cheese Said"	April 13, 2023	NLC-210	1.75
22	11	"Fry Me a River"	April 20, 2023	NLC-211	1.90
23	12	"Bake It 'til You Make It"	April 27, 2023	NLC-212	1.76
24	13	"Surf and Turf"	May 4, 2023	NLC-213	1.81
25	14	"Made in America"	May 11, 2023	NLC-214	1.85
26	15	"Next Level Finale"	May 11, 2023	NLC-215	1.65

== Ratings ==
Viewership and ratings per episode of Next Level Chef (American TV series) season 2
No.	Title	Air date	Timeslot (ET)	Rating/share (18–49)	Viewers (millions)	DVR (18–49)	DVR viewers (millions)	Total (18–49)	Total viewers (millions)	Ref.
1	"A Next Level Welcome"	February 12, 2023	Sunday 10:37 p.m.	5.0/38	15.66	TBD	TBD	TBD	TBD	
2	"Party Like a Guac Star"	February 16, 2023	Thursday 8:00 p.m.	0.4/3	1.93	TBD	TBD	TBD	TBD	
3	"No Pain, No Grain"	February 23, 2023	Thursday 8:00 p.m.	0.4/4	2.08	TBD	TBD	TBD	TBD	
4	"Rice Guys Finish Last"	March 2, 2023	Thursday 8:00 p.m.	0.4/4	2.02	TBD	TBD	TBD	TBD	
5	"Game Time"	March 9, 2023	Thursday 8:00 p.m.	0.4/3	1.80	TBD	TBD	TBD	TBD	
6	"Sugar and Tea and Rum"	March 16, 2023	Thursday 8:00 p.m.	0.4/3	1.97	TBD	TBD	TBD	TBD	
7	"Here Fishy, Fishy"	March 23, 2023	Thursday 8:00 p.m.	0.5/4	2.00	TBD	TBD	TBD	TBD	
8	"Going Global"	March 30, 2023	Thursday 8:00 p.m.	0.4/4	1.80	TBD	TBD	TBD	TBD	
9	"Happy Hour"	April 6, 2023	Thursday 8:00 p.m.	0.5/5	1.98	TBD	TBD	TBD	TBD	
10	"That's What Cheese Said"	April 13, 2023	Thursday 8:00 p.m.	0.4/4	1.75	TBD	TBD	TBD	TBD	
11	"Fry Me a River"	April 20, 2023	Thursday 8:00 p.m.	0.4/4	1.90	TBD	TBD	TBD	TBD	
12	"Bake It 'til You Make It"	April 27, 2023	Thursday 8:00 p.m.	0.4/3	1.76	TBD	TBD	TBD	TBD	
13	"Surf and Turf"	May 4, 2023	Thursday 8:00 p.m.	0.4/4	1.81	TBD	TBD	TBD	TBD	
14	"Made In America"	May 11, 2023	Thursday 8:00 p.m.	0.4/4	1.85	TBD	TBD	TBD	TBD	
15	"Next Level Finale"	May 11, 2023	Thursday 9:00 p.m.	0.3/3	1.65	TBD	TBD	TBD	TBD	
