= Next Level Chef (American TV series) season 5 =

Season of television series

Next Level Chef
- Season 5
- Promotional poster for season 5, featuring (L to R) mentor Arrington, host Ramsay, and mentor Blais
- Starring: Nyesha Arrington; Richard Blais
- Hosted by: Gordon Ramsay
- No. of contestants: 24 (before auditions) & 15 (after auditions)
- Winner: Darian Bryan
- Runners-up: Connor Caine; Cole Lawson
- No. of episodes: 15

Release
- Original network: Fox
- Original release: January 29 – May 21, 2026

Season chronology
- ← Previous; Season 4

The fifth season of the American competitive reality television series Next Level Chef premiered on January 29, 2026, and concluded on May 21, 2026. Gordon Ramsay returned as host and mentor, and Nyesha Arrington and Richard Blais returned as mentors.

The season was won by professional chef Darian Bryan, with professional chefs Connor Caine and Cole Lawson being named runners-up.

== Production ==
On February 27, 2025, it was announced that Next Level Chef was renewed for a fifth and sixth season.

== Chefs ==
Note: The list below only includes chefs that made it onto the show after qualifying via an audition.

Contestant	Age	Status	Hometown/Home country	Result
Mareya Ibrahim-Jones	56	Social media chef	Capistrano Beach, California	Eliminated February 19
Elise Jesse	36	Home cook	Cincinnati, Ohio	Eliminated February 26
Emerson Batolome	46	Home cook	San Diego, California	Eliminated March 5
Matt Starcher	54	Social media chef	Chesapeake, Virginia	Eliminated March 12
Tim Laielli	35	Social media chef	Dripping Springs, Texas	Eliminated March 19
Amber Kellehan	30	Home cook	Joshua Tree, California	Eliminated April 2
Machete Gonzalez	34	Professional chef	Houston, Texas	Eliminated April 9
Jared Veldheer	38	Home cook	Grand Rapids, Michigan	Eliminated April 16
Danielle Kartes	43	Home cook	Puyallup, Washington	Eliminated April 23
Christian Alquiza	35	Social media chef	Austin, Texas	Eliminated April 30
Andy Allo	37	Social media chef	Malibu, California	Eliminated May 7
Gabrielle Coniglio	34	Professional chef	Palm Beach, Florida	Eliminated May 14
Cole Lawson	31	Professional chef	Los Angeles, California	Runners-up May 21
Connor Caine	30	Professional chef	Manhattan Beach, California	Runners-up May 21
Darian Bryan	34	Professional chef	Buffalo, New York	Winner May 21

== Elimination table ==
Place	Contestant	Episodes																
Place	Contestant	1	2	3	4		5	6	7	8	9	10	11	12	13	14	15	16
1	Darian	Adv			Blais	Win	Safe	Safe	Win	Safe	Risk	Safe	Safe	Win	Safe	Win^{\}	Win	Winner
2	Cole	Adv			Ram	Safe	Win	Win^{†}	Safe	Safe	Safe	Win	Risk	Win^{\}	Win	Risk	Win	Runner-up
2	Connor	Adv			Arr	Safe	Safe	Safe	Risk	Win^{†}	Win^{†}	Safe	Safe	Safe	Win^{\}	Safe	Risk	Runner-up
4	Gabrielle	Adv			Ram	Safe	Win	Win	Safe	Safe	Safe	Win^{†}	Win	Safe	Risk	Safe	Elim	
5	Andy		Adv		Ram	Safe	Win^{†*}	Win	Safe	Safe	Safe	Win	Win	Risk	Safe	Elim		
6	Christian		Adv		Blais	Win^{†}	Safe	Risk	Win	Safe	Safe	Safe	Safe	Risk	Elim			
7	Danielle			Adv	Arr	Safe	Safe	Safe	Risk	Win	Win	Safe	Risk	Elim				
8	Jared			Adv	Blais	Win	Safe	Safe	Win	Safe	Safe	Risk	Elim					
9	Machete	Adv			Arr	Safe	Safe	Safe	Risk	Win	Win	Elim						
10	Amber			Adv	Ram	Safe	Win	Win	Safe	Risk	Elim							
11	Tim		Adv		Blais	Win	Safe	Safe	Win	Elim								
12	Matt		Adv		Arr	Safe	Safe	Safe	Elim									
13	Emerson			Adv	Arr	Risk	Risk	Elim										
14	Elise			Adv	Blais	Win	Elim											
15	Mareya		Adv		Ram	Elim												
T-16	Diana			Elim														
T-16	Earl		Elim															
T-16	Michael	Elim																
T-19	Landon			Elim														
T-19	Miriam		Elim															
T-19	Henna	Elim																
T-22	Hunter			Elim														
T-22	Kevin		Elim															
T-22	Belinda	Elim																

^{†}The contestant cooked the best dish overall and won safety for their team or themselves.

*The contestant cooked the best dish on their team and was selected by their mentor to win an immunity pin.

^{\}The contestant cooked the best dish overall and won the Time Token.

The contestant advanced to the team draft.
The contestant was on the winning team or had the winning dish.
The contestant was not on the winning team nor had the winning dish, but was not chosen for the head-to-head cook-off.
The contestant was safe due to using their immunity pin and did not compete in the head-to-head cook-off.
The contestant was at risk of elimination and won the head-to-head cook-off.
The contestant was drafted to Gordon Ramsay's team.
The contestant was drafted to Nyesha Arrington's team.
The contestant was drafted to Richard Blais' team.
The contestant was eliminated from the competition.
The contestant was eliminated during the auditions.
The contestant withdrew from the competition.

== Episodes ==
No. overall	No. in season	Title	Original release date	Prod. code	U.S. viewers (millions)
57	1	"Auditions - Pro Chefs"	January 29, 2026	NLC-501	N/A
58	2	"Auditions - Social Media Chefs"	February 5, 2026	NLC-502	N/A
59	3	"Auditions - Home Chefs"	February 12, 2026	NLC-503	N/A
60	4	"The Draft/Taco Party"	February 19, 2026	NLC-504	N/A
61	5	"Sea Monsters"	February 26, 2026	NLC-505	N/A
62	6	"Bowl in One"	March 5, 2026	NLC-506	N/A
63	7	"Service, Please!"	March 12, 2026	NLC-507	N/A
64	8	"Mini Gordon"	March 19, 2026	NLC-508	N/A
65	9	"Ale's Well That Ends Well"	April 2, 2026	NLC-509	N/A
66	10	"Cowboy Cooking"	April 9, 2026	NLC-510	N/A
67	11	"The In-Season Tournament"	April 16, 2026	NLC-511	N/A
68	12	"Use Your Noodle"	April 23, 2026	NLC-512	N/A
69	13	"A Toast to America's 250th"	April 30, 2026	NLC-513	N/A
70	14	"The Ultimate Goal"	May 7, 2026	NLC-514	N/A
71	15	"Building a Legacy"	May 14, 2026	NLC-515	N/A
72	16	"The Final Level"	May 21, 2026	NLC-516	N/A
