= Andy Allo =

Cameroonian-American actress, musician (born 1989)

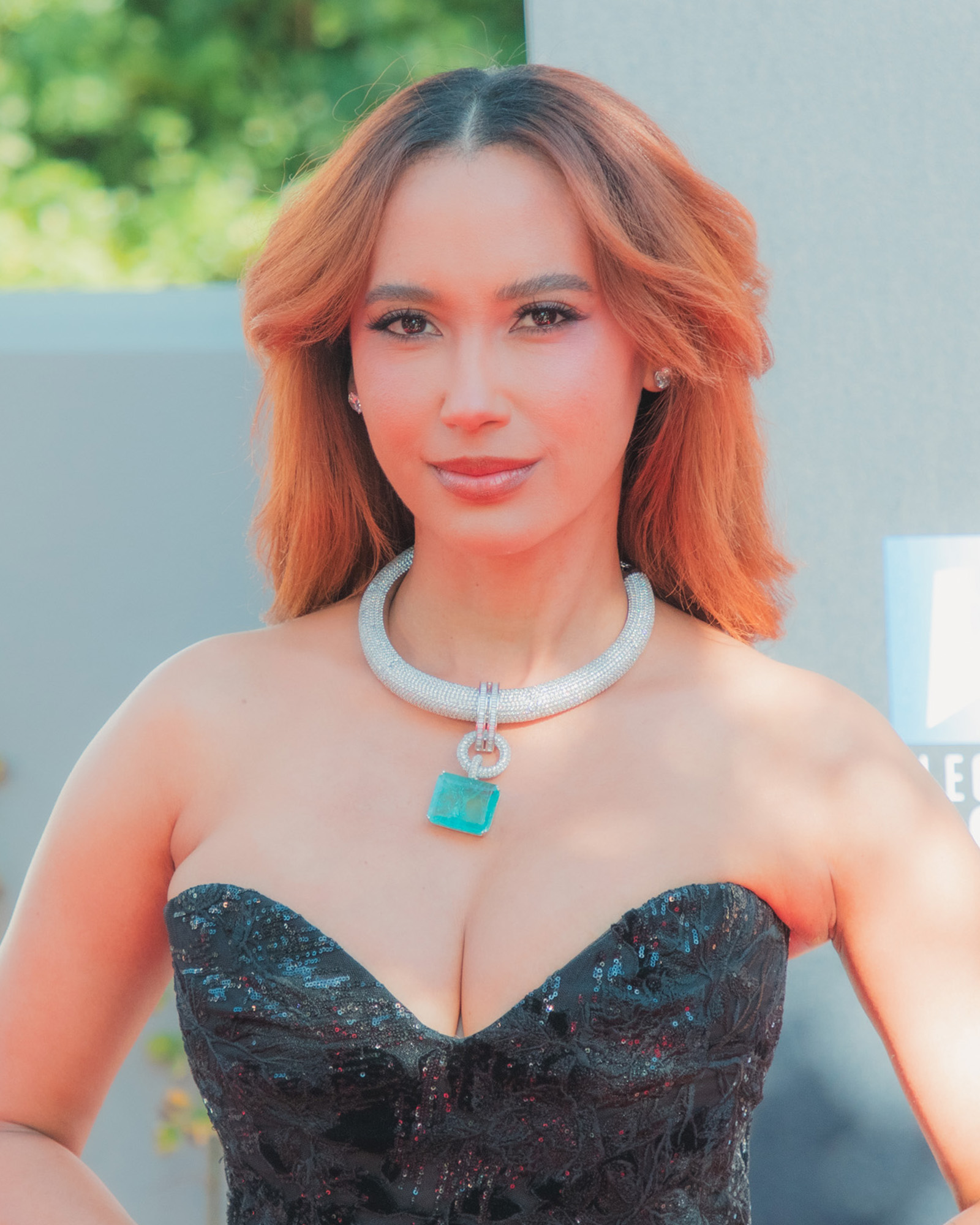
- Allo in March 2026

Background information
- Born: January 13, 1989 (age 37); Bamenda, Northwest Region, Cameroon
- Origin: Sacramento, California
- Genres: Funk, soul, neo-soul, rhythm and blues, pop
- Occupations: Actress, musician, model, singer-songwriter
- Instruments: Vocals, guitar, piano
- Website: www.andyallo.com

Andy Allo (born January 13, 1989) is a Cameroonian-American singer-songwriter, guitarist and actress. She released her first of three albums in 2009, and joined Prince's band, The New Power Generation, in 2011. She had a recurring role in three episodes of the comedy-drama series The Game in 2011, followed by a number of other roles, including a supporting role in the 2017 film Pitch Perfect 3 and the lead role of Nora in Amazon Prime's series Upload (2020). In 2026, she competed as a contestant in season 5 of Next Level Chef as a Social Media Chef on Team Gordon Ramsay.

== Early life and education ==
Born in Bamenda, Northwest Region, Cameroon, Allo developed an interest in music at an early age; her mother taught her to play the piano at age seven. She also went to PNEU school Bamenda, Cameroon. She is the youngest of five siblings. Allo holds dual citizenship in the United States and Cameroon and moved with her sister Suzanne to Sacramento in 2000 at the age of eleven, joining three other siblings. Her Californian-born mother, Sue, was forced to move back after suffering chronic fatigue syndrome. Her father Andrew Allo (1943–2025) was an ecologist.

Allo's US education began in seventh grade at Arden Middle School in Sacramento, and she graduated in 2006 from El Camino Fundamental High School in Sacramento. Following high school, Allo attended American River College in Sacramento. At that time, Allo formed her own band, Allo and the Traffic Jam, which occasionally performed for tips on the corner of 22nd and J streets in Sacramento.

== Career ==
Allo's first solo gig was an open mic night in 2008 at the Fox & Goose Public House in downtown Sacramento. In 2009, she released her first independent album, UnFresh, a collection of 12 original songs. The album's first single, "Dreamland", features the rapper Blu.

Allo's reputation as a musician led her to a role as a singer and guitarist in Prince's band, the New Power Generation, in 2011. She began writing with Prince while on tour, collaborating on three songs, "Superconductor", "The Calm" and "Long Gone", which appear on Allo's album, Superconductor.

Superconductor was released on November 20, 2012, and the album debuted at number one on Amazon.com's Soul and R&B charts in France, the United Kingdom and the US She also appeared on three songs on Prince's 2014 album Art Official Age, in "Breakdown", she sings background vocals, and on both "What It Feels Like" and "Time", she sings co-lead vocals. She would appear again on a Prince album in 2015, when he included "Rocknroll Loveaffair" on Hit n Run Phase Two, and it also includes "Xtralovable", which was originally released in 2011 and included a rap verse by Allo, but it was replaced by a horn section in this version.

In October 2014, she released her single "Tongue Tied". Hello was released in April 2015 and was funded through PledgeMusic. In the same year she collaborated with Prince on a covers project titled Oui Can Luv.

Allo first appeared on screen in 2011, in three episodes of the comedy-drama series The Game. She has been interviewed on the talk show Attack of the Show!, and performed her music on the talk show Jimmy Kimmel Live!.

In 2017, she appeared in the film Pitch Perfect 3 as Serenity, a member of the band called Evermoist, alongside Ruby Rose. She played the female lead role of Nora in the Amazon Prime series Upload (2020–2025).

In March 2023, Allo guest voiced Lyanna Hazard, daughter of Shep Hazard and niece of Phee Genoa, in Star Wars: The Bad Batch.

== Discography ==
=== Albums ===
- UnFresh (2009)
- Superconductor (2012)
- Hello (2015)
- Oui Can Luv (2015)
- One Step Closer (2017)

== Filmography ==
Film
Year	Title	Role	Notes
2017	Pitch Perfect 3	Serenity	
2020	2 Minutes of Fame	Taylor	
2023	Assassin	Mali	
2025	Absolute Dominion	Naya Olinga	Video on demand

Television
Year	Title	Role	Notes
2011	The Game	Allison	Recurring role (3 episodes)
2018	Black Lightning	Zoe B.	Episode: "The Book of Consequences: Chapter Two: Black Jesus Blues"
2019–2023	Chicago Fire	Lieutenant Wendy Seager	Recurring role
2020–2025	Upload	Nora Antony	Main cast
2023-2024	Star Wars: The Bad Batch	Lyana Hazard (voice)	Episode: "Pabu"
2026	Next Level Chef	Contestant	Season 5, 5th Place
