= Cassie Yeung =

American chef and TikToker (born 1994)

- Born: April 13, 1994 (age 32); South Brunswick, New Jersey, U.S.
- Education: Rutgers University
- Occupations: Chef; writer; TikToker; YouTuber; dancer
- Years active: 2016–present

TikTok information
- Page: cassyeungmoney
- Followers: 4.2 M
- Last updated: April 2, 2026

Cassie Yeung (born April 13, 1994) is an American chef, TikToker, and dancer.

== Early life and education ==
Yeung was born on April 13, 1994, and grew up in South Brunswick, New Jersey. She is of Chinese Singaporean descent. Yeung attended South Brunswick High School, where she was a member of the gymnastics team. She graduated from Rutgers University, where she was a member of the Rutgers Scarlet Knights dance team, with a degree in communications.

== Career ==
After graduating from college, Yeung was hired as a Brooklynette, the official NBA cheerleading team for the Brooklyn Nets. She danced for the Brooklyn Nets from the 2016 to 2018 season.

With the support of her parents, Yeung quit her day job and began working as a social media content creator full time, making cooking videos on the social media platform TikTok. Yeung amassed over three million followers on TikTok becoming a TikTok star and influencer. Shortly after beginning her online career, Yeung competed on the second season of Gordon Ramsay's cooking reality television show Next Level Chef. She placed fourteenth in the competition, and was eliminated on March 9, 2023.

In 2024, Yeung was listed in People's Creators of the Year.

Yeung published a cookbook titled Bad B*tch in the Kitch in October 2025. Subtitled Craveable Asian Recipes to Ditch the Takeout, it includes Chinese, Thai, Vietnamese, and Singaporean recipes.

== Personal life ==
Yeung lives in Philadelphia.
