= Jared Veldheer =

American football player (born 1987)

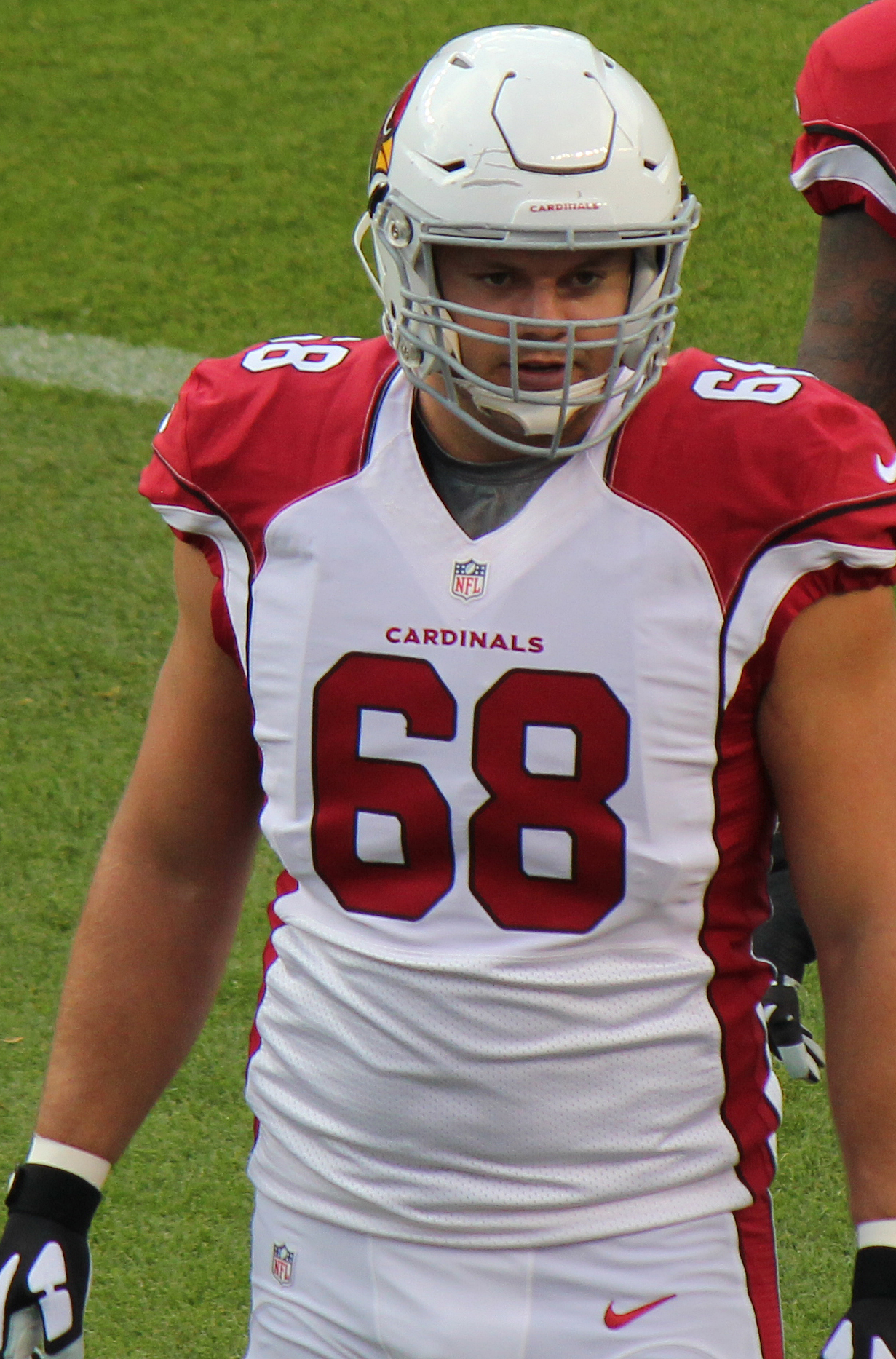
- Veldheer with the Arizona Cardinals in 2015

No. 65, 68
- Position: Offensive tackle

Personal information
- Born: June 14, 1987 (age 39); Grand Rapids, Michigan, U.S.
- Listed height: 6 ft 8 in (2.03 m)
- Listed weight: 321 lb (146 kg)

Career information
- High school: Forest Hills Northern (Grand Rapids)
- College: Hillsdale (2005–2009)
- NFL draft: 2010: 3rd round, 69th overall pick

Career history
- Oakland Raiders (2010–2013); Arizona Cardinals (2014–2017); Denver Broncos (2018); New England Patriots (2019)*; Green Bay Packers (2019); Indianapolis Colts (2020); Green Bay Packers (2020); Indianapolis Colts (2023)
- * Offseason or practice squad member only

Awards and highlights
- First-team All-American (2009); AFCA first-team All-Region (2009); First-team All-GLIAC (2008); Second-team All-GLIAC (2007); Offensive Freshman of the Year (2006)

Career NFL statistics
- Games played: 121
- Games started: 114
- Stats at Pro Football Reference

Jared Veldheer (born June 14, 1987) is an American former professional football player who was an offensive tackle in the National Football League (NFL). He was selected by the Oakland Raiders in the third round of the 2010 NFL draft. He played college football for the Hillsdale Chargers.

== Early life and college ==
Veldheer was born in Grand Rapids, Michigan to Jim and Mary Veldheer. His father, Jim, is third cousins with former NFL tackle, Kevin Haverdink. He has two siblings, one older brother (Aaron Veldheer) and a younger sister (Meghan Veldheer). Jared graduated from Forest Hills Northern High School in 2005. In high school, Veldheer was named Most Valuable Lineman and played two years of varsity basketball, and his high school football coach Brent Myers graduated from Hillsdale College, the NCAA Division II college that Veldheer would attend. In 2008, Veldheer was co-captain of the Hillsdale Chargers football team. After the 2009 season, the American Football Coaches Association named him First-team All-American. Veldheer is an alumnus of the Delta Sigma Phi fraternity.

== Professional career ==
Pre-draft measurables
Height	Weight	Arm length	Hand span	40-yard dash	10-yard split	20-yard split	20-yard shuttle	Three-cone drill	Vertical jump	Broad jump	Bench press
6 ft 8 1/8 in (2.04 m)	312 lb (142 kg)	33 in (0.84 m)	10 in (0.25 m)	5.09 s	1.73 s	2.94 s	4.51 s	7.40 s	33.5 in (0.85 m)	9 ft 1 in (2.77 m)	32 reps
All values from NFL Combine

=== Oakland Raiders ===
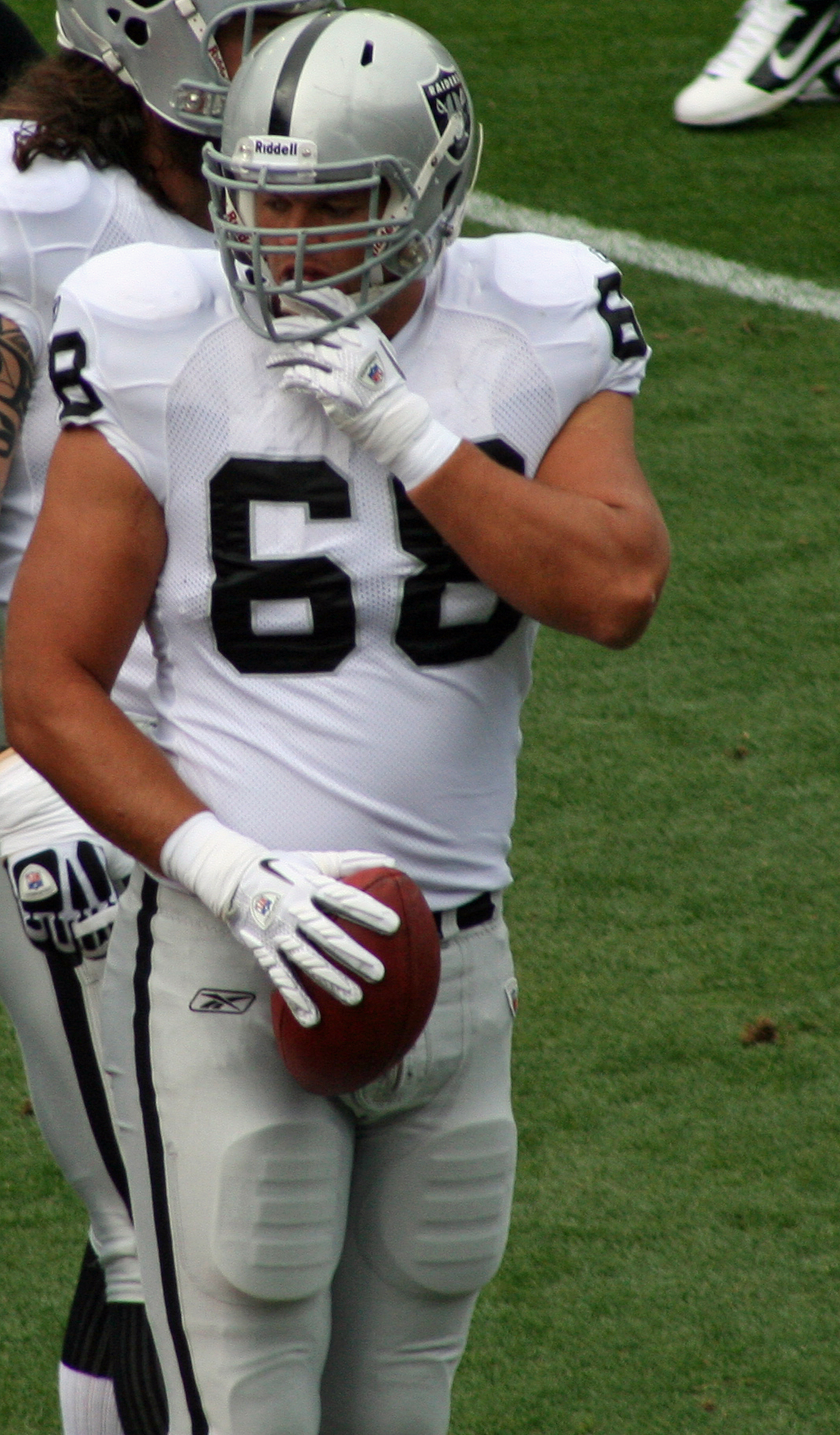
Veldheer with the Raiders in 2010.

Veldheer was selected by the Oakland Raiders in the third round (69th overall) of the 2010 NFL draft. At the conclusion of the 2010 preseason, he was named Oakland's starting center, beating out veteran Samson Satele. However, after the first game, Veldheer was moved back to offensive tackle, replaced at center by Satele for the rest of the season, and began sharing time with veteran Mario Henderson. By midseason, Veldheer had supplanted Henderson to become the Raiders' full-time starting left tackle. On opening day of the 2011 NFL season, he started at left tackle next to rookie Stefen Wisniewski and the offensive line cleared the way for 190 rushing yards and a victory over the Denver Broncos.

=== Arizona Cardinals ===
On March 11, 2014, Veldheer signed a five-year, $35 million contract with the Arizona Cardinals. On October 31, 2016, Veldheer was placed on injured reserve after tearing his right triceps in Week 8.

In 2017, Veldheer started the first 13 games at right tackle before being placed on injured reserve on December 11, 2017 with an ankle injury.

=== Denver Broncos ===
On March 23, 2018, Veldheer was traded to the Broncos for a 2018 sixth round pick. He started 12 games at right tackle, missing four games with a knee injury.

=== New England Patriots ===
On May 13, 2019, Veldheer signed with the New England Patriots on a one-year deal. On May 21, 2019, just a week after signing with the Patriots, Veldheer announced his retirement from the NFL; the Patriots used his roster spot to sign Gunner Olszewski. He was subsequently placed on the reserve/retired list by the team, but was waived from the list on November 26, 2019, after expressing interest in playing again.

=== Green Bay Packers (first stint) ===
On November 27, 2019, Veldheer was claimed off waivers by the Green Bay Packers. He was reinstated from the reserve/retired list on November 29, and the team received a roster exemption for him. He was activated on December 9, 2019. He saw his first action as a Packer on December 23 during a Week 16 victory over the Minnesota Vikings. On December 29, during a Week 17 victory over the Detroit Lions, Veldheer stepped in at right tackle when starter Bryan Bulaga left the game with a concussion and did not return.

On September 21, 2020, Veldheer announced his retirement again despite receiving a contract offer from the Dallas Cowboys.

=== Indianapolis Colts (first stint) ===
Veldheer had a free agent visit with the Indianapolis Colts on December 28, 2020. He was signed to their practice squad on December 31. He was elevated to the active roster on January 2 and 8, 2021, for the team's week 17 and wild card playoff games against the Jacksonville Jaguars and Buffalo Bills, and he reverted to the practice squad after each game.

=== Green Bay Packers (second stint) ===
On January 12, 2021, the Packers signed Veldheer off of the Colts' practice squad. He was placed on the reserve/COVID-19 list one day later.

On May 27, 2021, Veldheer was suspended for six games for violating the league's performance-enhancing drug policy. After his suspension was announced, he said the positive drug test resulted from taking Clomifene and he would subsequently retire from the NFL.

=== Indianapolis Colts (second stint) ===
On December 8, 2023, the Colts hosted Veldheer for a workout. It was announced that he would sign with the practice squad on December 11. He was not signed to a reserve/future contract after the season and thus became a free agent upon the expiration of his practice squad contract.

== Personal life ==
In 2025, while airing in 2026, Veldheer competed in FOX's season 5 of Next Level Chef, an American cooking show.
