= Victoria Omobuwajo =

- Born: Victoria Omobuwajo; 7 April 1993 (age 33); East London, England
- Education: Bayes Business School
- Occupations: Businesswoman; television personality
- Known for: Gordon Ramsay's Food Stars
- Successor: Jess Druey
- Awards: Winner of Gordon Ramsay's Food Stars

Victoria Omobuwajo (born 7 April 1993) is a British-Nigerian businesswoman and television personality, who won the first season of the Gordon Ramsay reality television series broadcast on BBC One, Gordon Ramsay's Food Stars.

== Early life ==
Omobuwajo was born on 7 April 1993 in East London, England. She attended primary school at Holy Trinity Church of England School and Sir John Cass Secondary. Omobuwajo further her education at Queen Mary University where she studied mathematics, and subsequently completed a Bachelor's of Science with Honors Degree in Accounting and Finance at the Bayes Business School-London.

== Career ==
She is the founder and CEO of UK based, hand-cooked and natural Plantain Crisps and Sweet Potato Puffs snacks business, titled Sunmo which was launched in 2019 in the United Kingdom.

=== Gordon Ramsay's Food Stars ===
Omobuwajo qualified to be one of the top 12 contestants in Gordon Ramsay's Food Stars 2022 series, a cooking reality television program hosted by Gordon Ramsay. She was declared the competition winner over runners-up Leah Harkess and Stephanie Buttery in a unique launch event to promote their product, their brand and themselves, and, after grilling each one, Gordon Ramsay chose Victoria Omobuwajo as winner on 19 May 2022, winning £150,000 as prize money.

== Filmography ==
=== Television ===
Year	Title	Role	Notes
2022	Gordon Ramsay's Food Stars	Herself - Contestant	8 episodes

== Recognition and awards ==
In 2023, Omobuwajo won Best Caterer, presented by The Forty under 40 Awards UK.

In 2023, Omobuwajo was named in the "30 under 30 Young Entrepreneur" by Forbes UK Magazine.

She was enlisted by HSBC UK & UK Black Business Show in Top 25 Top Black Entrepreneurs to Watch in 2024.
