= Next Level Chef (British TV series) =

British reality television series

- Genre: Reality competition; Culinary
- Created by: Tom Day
- Presented by: Gordon Ramsay
- Starring: Nyesha Arrington; Paul Ainsworth
- Country of origin: United Kingdom
- Original language: English
- No. of series: 1
- No. of episodes: 8

Production
- Executive producer: Gordon Ramsay
- Camera setup: Multi-camera
- Production company: Studio Ramsay Global

Original release
- Network: ITV
- Release: 11 January – 2 March 2023

Next Level Chef (also known as Next Level Chef UK) is a British culinary reality competition television series that premiered in 2023 and is hosted by Gordon Ramsay.

The series was cancelled after one season due to low ratings.

== Chefs ==
Contestant	Age	Status	Hometown/Home Country	Result
Bethika "Tia" Khurana	50	Home cook	Birmingham	Eliminated (January 11)
Selwyn Channon	63	Ex-Professional chef	Lympsham	Eliminated (January 18)
Layla Powell	41	Professional chef	London	Eliminated (January 25)
Kelly Hunter	45	Ex-Professional chef	Great Dunmow	Eliminated (February 1)
Temi Abdullahi	27	Social media chef	London	Eliminated (February 8)
Gurpreet Bains	25	Professional chef	Gravesend	Eliminated (February 15)
Toby Caswell-Jones	22	Professional chef	Liverpool	Eliminated (February 23)
Ian "Gold" Golding	51	Home cook	Kings Langley	Eliminated (February 23)
Tony Maloy	40	Professional chef	Theddingworth	Eliminated (February 23)
Callum Deboys	26	Ex-Professional chef	Prestwick, Scotland	Runner-ups (March 2)
Ronan Lee	25	Home cook	London	Runner-ups (March 2)
Jade Greenhalgh	34	Social media chef	Ormskirk	Winner (March 2)

== Elimination table ==
Place	Contestant	Episodes								
Place	Contestant	1		2	3	4	5	6	7	8
1	Jade	RAM	WIN	SAFE	WIN^{†}	RISK	SAFE	WIN	WIN	WINNER
2	Callum	RAM	WIN^{†}	SAFE	WIN	SAFE	WIN	RISK	WIN	RUNNER-UP
2	Ronan	ARR	SAFE	WIN	SAFE	WIN^{†}	SAFE	SAFE	RISK	RUNNER-UP
4	Gold	AIN	SAFE	SAFE	RISK	SAFE	RISK	SAFE	ELIM	
4	Tony	ARR	SAFE	WIN	SAFE	WIN	WIN	WIN	ELIM	
6	Toby	RAM	WIN	SAFE	WIN	SAFE	SAFE	RISK	ELIM	
7	Gurpreet	AIN	SAFE	SAFE	SAFE	SAFE	RISK	ELIM		
8	Temi	AIN	SAFE	RISK	SAFE	SAFE	ELIM			
9	Kelly	AIN	RISK	SAFE	SAFE	ELIM				
10	Layla	ARR	SAFE	WIN^{†}	ELIM					
11	Selwyn	RAM	WIN	ELIM						
12	Tia	ARR	ELIM							

^{†}The contestant cooked the best dish overall and won safety for their team or themselves.

The contestant was on the winning team or had the winning dish.
The contestant was not on the winning team nor had the winning dish, but was not chosen for the head-to-head cook-off.
The contestant was at risk of elimination and won the head-to-head cook-off.
The contestant was drafted to Gordon Ramsay's team.
The contestant was drafted to Nyesha Arrington's team.
The contestant was drafted to Paul Ainsworth's team.
The contestant was eliminated from the competition.

== Critical reception ==
The Guardian wrote "Next Level Chef is a breathless, bewildering gabble of a show. This is a cookery contest that is so obsessed with contrived competition that it almost completely forgets about food."
