= Oui Can Luv =

Studio album by Andy Allo featuring Prince
- Released: November 9, 2015
- Genre: Acoustic
- Length: 30:46
- Label: NPG
- Producer: Prince

Andy Allo chronology
Superconductor (2012)	Oui Can Luv (2015)

Oui Can Luv is a studio album by Andy Allo featuring Prince on guitar, containing nine acoustic tracks, mostly covers. To date, the album was only available for 12 hours on November 9, 2015, on the music streaming service Tidal, with which Prince had an extensive partnership.

== Track listing ==
1. "Fast Car" – 4:10
2. "Push and Pull" – 3:31
3. "Love Is a Losing Game" – 3:06
4. "False Alarm" – 2:49
5. "Wild World" – 2:28
6. "I Love U in Me" – 4:19
7. "Waiting in Vain" – 3:09
8. "Oui Can Luv" – 4:20
9. "More than This" – 2:59
