= Gordon Ramsay's Future Food Stars =

- Genre: Reality competition; Culinary
- Presented by: Gordon Ramsay
- Country of origin: United Kingdom
- Original language: English
- No. of series: 2
- No. of episodes: 16

Production
- Executive producers: Gordon Ramsey; Lisa Edwards; Bradley Thornhill; Joe Wildman
- Camera setup: Multi-camera
- Production companies: Studio Ramsay Global; Objective Media Group

Original release
- Network: BBC One
- Release: 31 March 2022 – 25 May 2023

Gordon Ramsay's Future Food Stars is a British food competition reality television series hosted by Gordon Ramsay where twelve food entrepreneurs compete to win £150,000 from Ramsay to invest in their business. The show premiered 31 March 2022. The second series premiered 30 March 2023. The show was cancelled after two series.

== Episodes ==
Each series consisted of 8 episodes.

== See also ==
- Gordon Ramsay's Food Stars
