= Elisa Strauss =

Proprietor, author and television personality (born 1976)

- Born: June 9, 1976 (age 50); Roslyn, North Hempstead, New York, U.S.
- Education: Roslyn High School
- Alma mater: School of the Art Institute of Chicago; Vassar College; Institute of Culinary Education
- Occupations: Businesswoman; author; television personality
- Known for: Gordon Ramsay's Food Stars
- Relatives: Eric M. Strauss (brother)
- Website: confetticakes.com

Elisa Strauss (born June 9, 1976) is the proprietor of Confetti Cakes, a New York City-based bakery specializing in custom-designed cakes. Confetti Cakes enjoys a large celebrity following, and Strauss has been featured on numerous television shows, including three Food Network Challenge series, Martha, and Today. One of her cakes was also featured on HBO's Sex and the City as Charlotte and Harry's wedding cake. Strauss is the author (with Christie Matheson) of an instructional cookbook featuring many recipes and methods for decorated cookies, cupcakes, mini cakes, and more elaborate sculpted cakes.

== Childhood ==
Strauss grew up in Roslyn, New York, on the North Shore of Long Island. She is the daughter of Karen and Elton Strauss. Her mother is a professional harpist and her father is an orthopedic surgeon. She has one brother, Eric M. Strauss, a producer at ABC News.

Strauss started to draw at a young age and learned to bake from her grandmother Pearl Gustin.

== Life before the business ==
Strauss graduated from Roslyn High School in 1994 and Vassar College in 1998 with a degree in Studio Art. She also spent a semester during her junior year at The Art Institute of Chicago. Before starting her bakery, Strauss worked as a textile designer at Polo Ralph Lauren and a handbag and hair accessory designer at Frederic Fekkai. While working in fashion, Strauss attended pastry school at the Institute of Culinary Education and graduated with a degree in baking and pastry arts in 2000. While working and going to school, Strauss was asked to make Ralph Lauren's 60th birthday cake in the shape of his Bugatti sports car. Soon after she was asked to design a shoe cake for the famous shoe designer Manolo Blahnik

== Career ==
She launched her business Confetti Cakes in 2000.

Strauss is a world-renowned baker who has appeared in numerous magazines including Elle, InStyle, Marie Claire, Modern Bride, Vogue and more. She has appeared on television on the Food Network Challenge and Rachel Ray's 30 Minute Meals. Strauss was on the Food Network Challenge where she won an episode in season 5 (episode 7) called "Extreme Cakes".

== Custom Cake Shop ==
In 2001, Strauss incorporated her company, Ltd and began working out of a commercial space on the Upper West Side of Manhattan.

== Filmography ==
=== Television ===
Year	Title	Role	Notes
2023	Gordon Ramsay's Food Stars	Herself – Contestant	

== Books ==
The Confetti Cakes Cookbook: Spectacular Cookies, Cakes, and Cupcakes from New York City's Famed Bakery (2007) Little, Brown and Company ISBN 0-316-11307-7

- Review

Confetti Cakes For Kids: Delightful Cookies, Cakes, and Cupcakes from New York City's Famed Bakery (2008) Little, Brown and Company ISBN 978-0316118293
