= Megan Meza =

American businesswoman, television personality

- Born: April 14, 1990 (age 36); San Diego, California, U.S.
- Education: Duke University (BSc); International Culinary Center
- Occupations: Businesswoman; television personality
- Known for: Gordon Ramsay's Food Stars
- Website: holabandida.com

Megan Meza (born April 14, 1990) is an American businesswoman and television personality. She appeared on the reality television series, Gordon Ramsay's Food Stars.

== Early life ==
Meza was born on April 14, 1990 in San Diego, California. She attended Duke University and graduated with a Bachelor of Science degree with a major in political science and a minor in Environmental Science and Policy. In 2016, Megan Meza studied Culinary Techniques at the International Culinary Center for one year.

== Career ==
Megan Meza has been the CEO founder at Bandida in New York City since August 2019. Bandida manufactures the dairy-free Horchata Cold Brew Coffee which is made from a creamy blend of rice, coconut and cashew milk with notes of cinnamon, vanilla, as well as a touch of sweetness. She was the associate director of engagement planning, and customer experience lead at Ogilvy & Mather, an advertising agency.

== Filmography ==
=== Television ===
Year	Title	Role	Notes
2023	Gordon Ramsay's Food Stars	Herself - Contestant	7 episodes
