= Next Level Baker =

American reality competition television series

- Presented by: Gordon Ramsay
- Judges: Carla Hall; Candace Nelson; Waylynn Lucas
- Country of origin: United States
- Original language: English
- No. of seasons: 2
- No. of episodes: 5

Production
- Executive producers: Gordon Ramsay; Matt Cahoon
- Production companies: BiggerStage; Fox Alternative Entertainment; Studio Ramsay Global

Original release
- Network: Fox
- Release: December 4, 2025 – present

Related
- Next Level Chef

Next Level Baker is an American reality competition television series that premiered on Fox on December 4, 2025. It is a spin-off of Next Level Chef.

In May 2026, the series was renewed for a second and third season, with the second season premiering in November 2026.

== Production ==
On February 27, 2025, it was announced that Fox had ordered the series. On October 10, 2025, it was announced that the series would premiere on December 4, 2025. On November 13, 2025, the bakers were announced.

On May 11, 2026, the series was renewed for a second and third season. The second season premiered on November 19, 2026.

== Bakers ==
Contestant	Age	Status	Hometown/Home country	Result
Michael Mararian	60	Home baker	Buffalo, New York	Eliminated December 4
Justin Ellen	22	Social media baker	Passaic, New Jersey	Eliminated December 4
Winston Murdock	39	Professional baker	Orlando, Florida	Eliminated December 4
Maricsa Trejo	34	Professional baker	Mesquite, Texas	Eliminated December 4
Aubrey Smith Shaffner	33	Professional baker	Baltimore, Maryland	Eliminated December 11
Chad Visger	36	Professional baker	Delavan, Wisconsin	Eliminated December 11
Jeff Chudakoff	32	Home baker	West Hollywood, California	Eliminated December 18
Nikita "Nikki" Jackson	60	Social media baker	Rowlett, Texas	Runners-up December 18
Chloe Sexton	31	Social media baker	Germantown, Tennessee	Runners-up December 18
Zoha Malik	30	Social media baker	Newark, California	Runners-up December 18
Deirdra Lambright	26	Home baker	Atlanta, Georgia	Runners-up December 18
Stefanie Embree	39	Home baker	Oklahoma City, Oklahoma	Winner December 18

== Elimination table ==
Place	Contestant	Episodes		
Place	Contestant	1	2	3
1	Stefanie	Win	Win	Winner
2	Nikki	Safe	Safe	Runner-up
2	Zoha	Safe	Safe	Runner-up
2	Chloe	Win	Safe	Runner-up
2	Deirdra	Safe	Safe	Runner-up
6	Jeff	Safe	Win	Elim
7	Chad	Win	Elim	
8	Aubrey	Win	Elim	
9	Maricsa	Elim		
T-10	Winston	Elim		
T-10	Justin	Elim		
T-10	Michael	Elim		

== Episodes ==
=== Series overview ===
Season	Episodes	Originally released	
Season	Episodes	First released	Last released
1	4	December 4, 2025	December 18, 2025
2	TBA	November 19, 2026	TBA

=== Season 1 (2025) ===
No. overall	No. in season	Title	Original release date	Prod. code	U.S. viewers (millions)
1	1	"Baking Spirits Bright"	December 4, 2025	NLB-101	N/A
2	2	"This Is Snow Joke"	December 11, 2025	NLB-102	N/A
3	3	"A Not So Silent Night"	December 18, 2025	NLB-103/104	N/A
4	4	"A Not So Silent Night"	December 18, 2025	NLB-103/104	N/A

=== Season 2 (2026) ===
No. overall	No. in season	Title	Original release date	Prod. code	U.S. viewers (millions)
5	1	"A Slice of the Season"	November 19, 2026	NLB-201	TBD
6	2	"Jam Packed with Joy"	November 26, 2026	NLB-202	TBD
