= FLIP Burger Boutique =

Restaurant chain based in Atlanta, Georgia, U.S.

Coordinates: 33°47′54″N 84°24′57″W

FLIP burger boutique
- Interactive map of FLIP burger boutique

Restaurant information
- Established: December 10, 2008; 17 years ago
- Owners: Joseph Hsiao; Matthew Hsiao
- Head chef: Richard Blais
- Food type: Contemporary American cuisine
- Dress code: Casual
- Location: 1587 Howell Mill Rd. NW, Atlanta, Georgia, 30318, United States
- Reservations: No
- Website: flipburgerboutique.com

FLIP burger boutique (stylized as FLIP) was an upscale full-service American restaurant based in Atlanta, Georgia. The company opened its restaurant in West Midtown, Atlanta in 2008. The restaurant was generally well received by food critics for its ambiance and food, though there had been criticism that the restaurant was "overdone". It had been credited as increasing competition among hamburger restaurants in Atlanta.

== History ==
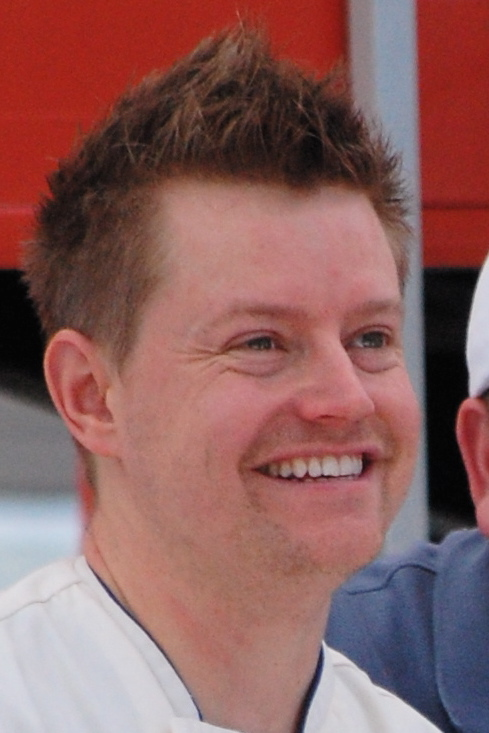
Richard Blais collaborated with Barry Mills in creating FLIP burger boutique's menu.

Barry Mills conceived the restaurant's concept as wanting to expand the definition of a what he thought was a hamburger. He sought inspiration from the new growth of hamburger eateries in Los Angeles and New York City, yet disliked their approaches, thinking it would hinder innovation—being bound to a traditional diner-style burger.

FLIP opened an outlet at The Summit in Birmingham, Alabama on December 19, 2010. Ron Stewart, one of the owners of the first Atlanta franchise, was born and raised in Birmingham. The company then opened an outlet on October 19, 2010 in Buckhead, Atlanta, at the Tuxedo Festival Shopping Center. Mills used architecture firm ai3 to design the interior of the restaurants.

The chain hoped to open a location in Washington, D.C. in the Penn Quarter in early 2010, but was unable to negotiate a lease. New York City and Miami have also been noted as potential sites for new outlets. Mills has stated that although its prices would rise, the chain should be able to expand throughout the United States.

== Critical reception ==
FLIP burger boutique has been generally well received by food critics. For example, Food & Wine journalist Dana Cowin wrote that "Richard Blais's 'burger boutique' is mod, ambitious and delicious." Wine & Spirits writer Krista Reese praised the pricing of the menu and its unique ingredients. And The Atlanta Journal-Constitution described the menu as "fun", allowing Blais to "play with the whimsical goofiness that makes him, well, him." ' The architecture and the atmosphere of the chain's restaurants have also been lauded.

However, there are also negative reviews. Creative Loafing in December 2010 called the food at FLIP's Buckhead location "overly salty, overly sweet, overly complicated, overcooked, overfried and just overdone," with "fried sides that tasted of leadened fried bread". Critic Jennifer Zyman noted: "each burger tastes as if someone said, 'Dude, let's figure out a way to cram a bunch of crap on one plate so the diner can't identify a single ingredient.'" Furthermore, the newspaper remarked that the decor, as a "carbon copy" of the original Westside location, "except slightly larger," was "somehow less cool as a result." In the same month, Christian Lauterback in Knife & Fork called the Buckhead location "silly and expensive." Lauterbach characterized FLIP's approach as "heaping on garnishes and condiments and finishing everything with sugar" to ensure that patrons "can't taste anything." She also criticized a "stupefyingly bad" osso bucco burger with marrow-naise and gremolata.

== See also ==
- List of hamburger restaurants
