= Paul Ainsworth =

English chef from Southampton, England

- Born: 1978 or 1979 (age 47–48)
- Education: Southampton City College
- Spouse: Emma Ainsworth
- Culinary career
- Ratings
- Michelin Guide; AA Rosettes
- Current restaurants
- Paul Ainsworth at Number 6 Caffè Rojano; The Mariners Padstow Townhouse
- Website: Paul-Ainsworth.co.uk

Paul Ainsworth (born 1979) is a British chef from Southampton, England. He is chef-patron at Paul Ainsworth at Number 6 in Padstow, Cornwall which was awarded a Michelin star in 2013 and has four AA Rosettes. After studying at catering college, Ainsworth worked for Gary Rhodes, Gordon Ramsay and Marcus Wareing.

== Life and career ==
Ainsworth grew up in Southampton, England and lived in a guest house run by his mother, who is from the Seychelles, and his father. After leaving school, he studied hospitality and catering at Southampton City College. While he was at college, Gary Rhodes invited students to work for him and, following a successful interview, Ainsworth began working for Rhodes in 1998 at his restaurant Rhodes in the Square, located in London's Dolphin Square. He then worked for Gordon Ramsay at Restaurant Gordon Ramsay for three years before moving to Ramsay's Pétrus restaurant in 2003, working under Marcus Wareing for three years and continued to work for Wareing when he relocated to The Berkeley. He then opened his own restaurant along with two friends, which was funded by businessman Derek Mapp.

The restaurant, which is located at 6 Middle Street in Padstow, Cornwall, within an 18th-century town house, was originally named Cornwall – Number 6. However, in 2009 Ainsworth bought out his friends, taking over the business with his wife and, three years after opening, the restaurant was renamed Paul Ainsworth at Number 6. Although the restaurant is located close to the sea and is often considered – inaccurately, says Ainsworth – a competitor of Rick Stein's Seafood Restaurant also based in Padstow, Number 6 is not a seafood restaurant: "I’ve tried to complement him [Stein] and offer something different – showcase Cornwall's game and the shellfish and the meat, and the great artisan producers that we have here in Cornwall." Dishes on the menu include rib-eye steak, sweetbreads, anchovy and caviar toast and mussel broth. Ainsworth says his approach to cooking at Number 6 is to "source amazing local, seasonal ingredients and serve them in a simple modern style."

The restaurant was awarded a Michelin star in 2013 and its fourth AA Rosette in 2016. It is included in the Good Food Guide's top 50 UK restaurants with a rating of 7 out of 10 and describes Number 6 as "Padstow's premier gastronomic address". In 2013, Amol Rajan of The Independent rated the restaurant 8.5 out of 10.

Ainsworth also oversees Padstow Italian restaurant Rojano's in the Square which he reopened with businessman Mapp in 2011 and, along with his wife, runs The Townhouse guest house, also located in Padstow. The restaurant was re-branded as Caffe Rojano in 2020.

On 4 July 2024, Ainsworth's first cook book was published, titled For the Love of Food.

=== Television ===
In 2011, Ainsworth competed in the BBC's Great British Menu, winning the dessert course with a dish called Trip to the Fairground. He is a regular guest chef on BBC's Saturday Kitchen. He is a regular chef on BBC's Yes Chef and in 2017 was a chef on the BBC's Royal Recipes. In 2017, Ainsworth also appeared as a guest chef on the TV series MasterChef, creating dishes for the US Ambassador to the UK, cooked by the show's contestants. Since 2018, he has appeared as a judge on Great British Menu.

In 2023, Ainsworth served as a mentor alongside celebrity chefs Gordon Ramsay and Nyesha Arrington on the British version of Next Level Chef.
