= Fox & Goose Public House =

Pub in Sacramento, California, United States

- Fox & Goose
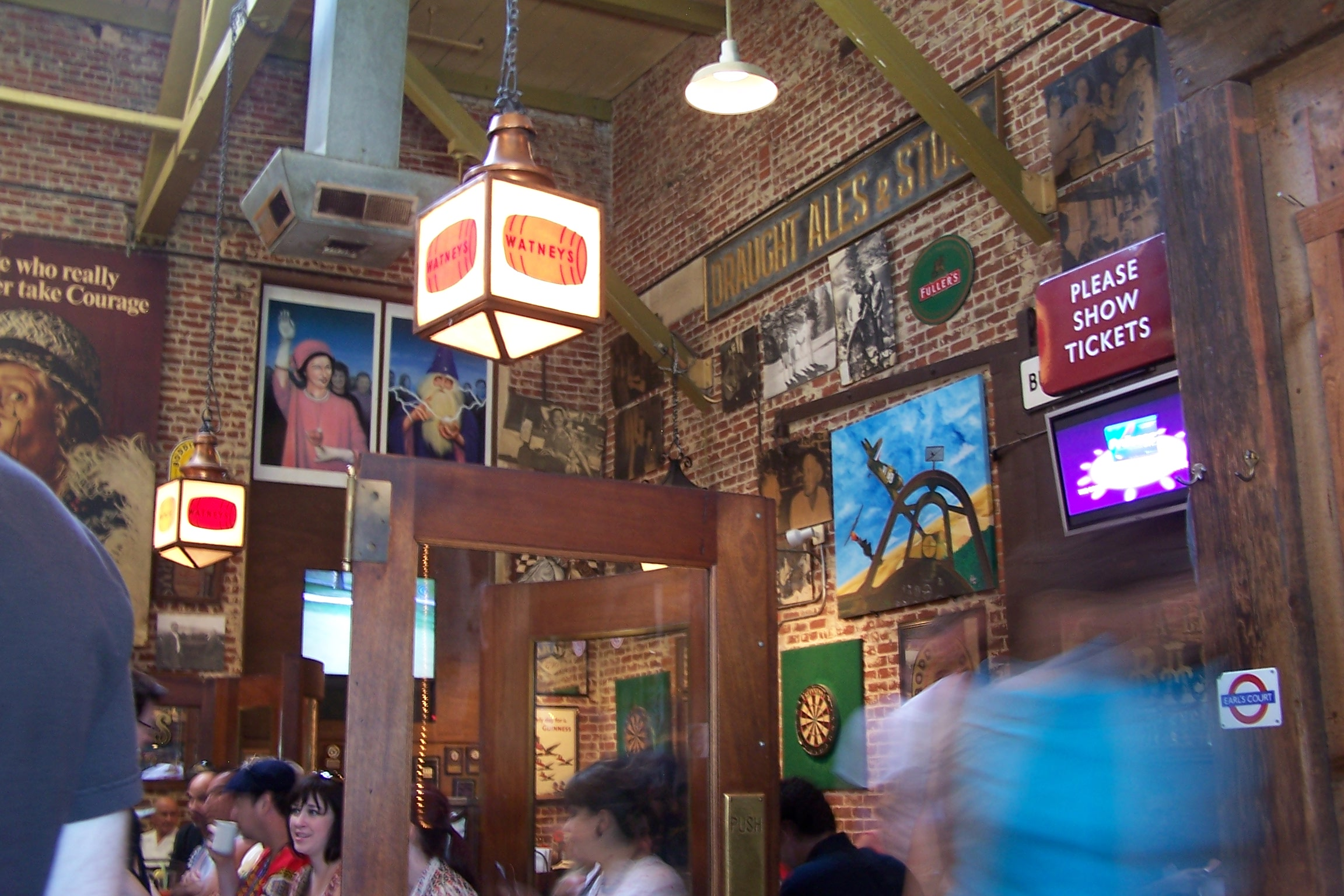
- Address: 1001 R St. Sacramento, California; United States
- Owner: Peter Monson

Construction
- Opened: 1975

Fox & Goose Public House is a British pub, restaurant, and music venue located at 1001 R St., in Sacramento, California. It was founded in 1975.

== History ==
The Dalton family, consisting of Bill and Denise Dalton, opened the Fox & Goose Public House in an abandoned Fuller Paint and Glass Company building in 1975. The pub is named after Bill Dalton's hometown pub in Hebden Bridge, Yorkshire, England. The building itself dates to 1913. Allyson Dalton, daughter of Bill and Denise, owned the business from 1995 to 2015. Peter Monson, longtime Fox & Goose employee, took over in 2015. The venue hosts a weekly open mic night, pub quiz trivia night, and free musical performances on weekends. It also serves breakfast, lunch, and dinner.

== Menu ==
The public serves fare such as quiche, corned beef hash, smoked salmon, omelets, waffles, pancakes, French toast, fish and chips, bangers and mash, olallieberry scones, salads, burgers, sandwiches, shepherd's pie, and chicken tikka masala.
