= Gordon Ramsay's Food Stars =

2023 American reality television series

- Genre: Reality competition
- Based on: Gordon Ramsay's Future Food Stars
- Presented by: Gordon Ramsay; Lisa Vanderpump (season 2)
- Country of origin: United States
- Original language: English
- No. of seasons: 2
- No. of episodes: 20

Production
- Executive producers: Gordon Ramsay; Danny Schrader
- Production companies: Fox Alternative Entertainment; Studio Ramsay Global

Original release
- Network: Fox; Nine Network
- Release: May 24, 2023 – July 24, 2024

Gordon Ramsay's Food Stars is an American reality competition series that premiered on Fox on May 24, 2023.

In March 2024, the series was renewed for a second season, which premiered on May 22, 2024.

== Format ==
In challenges, contestants are put in teams to test their business skills. Whichever team's business does better wins, while the losing team gets interrogated by Ramsay. In the end, at least one person is eliminated. The winner receives $250,000 and an investment from Ramsay.

== Production ==
On May 16, 2022, it was announced that Fox had ordered the series. It premiered on May 24, 2023.

On March 1, 2024, the series was renewed for a second season. On March 4, 2024, it was announced that the second season will premiere on May 22, 2024, and Lisa Vanderpump will join the show to compete against Gordon Ramsay.

== Contestants ==
=== Season 1 ===
Contestant	Age	Hometown	Product	Result
Chris Kanik	38	Mission Viejo, California	Smart Cups	Winner August 16
Caroline D'Amore	38	Los Angeles, California	Pizza Girl	Runners-up August 16
Lan Ho	TBA	Chicago, Illinois	Fat Miilk	Runners-up August 16
Ashley Davies	TBA	Norco, California	Happy Grub	Eliminated August 9
Aaron Valentine	20	Maryville, Missouri	Snow Cone King	Eliminated August 2
Tony Balestreri	TBA	Chicago, Illinois	Tony Bs Steak Chips	Eliminated August 2
Megan Meza	33	San Diego, California	Bandida Horchata Cold Brew	Eliminated July 19
Sydney Webb	TBA	Los Angeles, California	Toto Foods	Eliminated July 12
Queen Precious-Jewel Zabriskie	TBA	Franklinton, North Carolina	Indulge Catering	Eliminated June 21
Luther Chen	27	Los Angeles, California	Luther Bob's Fried Chicken	Eliminated June 14
Jake Aronskind	TBA	New York, New York	Pepper - The Social Cooking App	Eliminated June 7
Jourdan Higgs	TBA	Chicago, Illinois	Provaré Restaurant	Left the competition June 7
Chanel Goodson	TBA	Los Angeles, California	Vegan AF Food Truck	Left the competition June 7
Elisa Strauss	46	Roslyn, New York	Confetti Cakes	Eliminated May 31
Kagen Cox	TBA	Richland, Washington	Kagen Coffee & Crepes	Eliminated May 24

=== Season 2 ===
Team Ramsay

Contestant	Age	Hometown	Product	Result
Ali Schlichter	TBA	Denver, Colorado	Chin Dribblin	Runner-up July 24
Andrew Whiting	TBA	Santa Rosa, California	Hot Drops	Eliminated July 24
Liz Aust	28	Los Angeles, California	The Candy Closet	Eliminated July 17
Rose Hankins	36	Jonesboro, Arkansas	Twisted Dough	Eliminated July 10
Kyson Clark	31	Houston, Texas	Kal's Kickin Collection	Eliminated July 10
Chuan Liu	36	Sugar Land, Texas	Levels of Grandeur	Eliminated June 19
Tyler Dirks	37	Jonesboro, Arkansas	Lite-Rite Charcoal Grills	Eliminated May 29

Team Vanderpump

Contestant	Age	Hometown	Product	Result
Jess Druey	26	Bakersfield, California	Whiny Baby	Winner July 24
Roman Desmond	21	Jacksonville, Florida	Hot Box Pretzels	Runner-up July 24
Erica Bethe Levin	40	Chicago, Illinois	Globowl	Eliminated July 24
Nicholas Ducos	TBA	Philadelphia, Pennsylvania	Mural City	Eliminated July 17
Maria Laura Vacaflores	TBA	Miami, Florida	SQUAREAT	Eliminated June 26
Peri Basel	TBA	Boca Raton, Florida	Boce	Eliminated June 12
Kamal Grant	TBA	Atlanta, Georgia	Magic Middles	Eliminated June 5

== Episodes ==
=== Series overview ===
Season	Episodes	Originally released	
Season	Episodes	First released	Last released
1	10	May 24, 2023	August 16, 2023
2	10	May 22, 2024	July 24, 2024

=== Season 1 (2023) ===
No. overall	No. in season	Title	Original release date	Prod. code	U.S. viewers (millions)	Rating (18–49)
1	1	"Seaside Shack"	May 24, 2023	FDS-101	1.23	0.3
2	2	"Host with the Most"	May 31, 2023	FDS-102	1.67	0.3
3	3	"You've Got Wine"	June 7, 2023	FDS-103	1.56	0.3
4	4	"Got This in the Bag"	June 14, 2023	FDS-104	1.64	0.3
5	5	"Campfire Feast"	June 21, 2023	FDS-105	1.61	0.3
6	6	"Social Feed"	July 12, 2023	FDS-106	1.38	0.3
7	7	"Cup of Joe"	July 19, 2023	FDS-107	1.40	0.2
8	8	"As Seen on TV"	August 2, 2023	FDS-108	1.32	0.2
9	9	"Feast Your Eyes"	August 9, 2023	FDS-109	1.44	0.2
10	10	"Finale"	August 16, 2023	FDS-110	1.51	0.3

=== Season 2 (2024) ===
No. overall	No. in season	Title	Original release date	Prod. code	U.S. viewers (millions)	Rating (18–49)
11	1	"Pitch for Your Life"	May 22, 2024	FDS-201	1.14	0.2
12	2	"The Bootcamp Begins"	May 29, 2024	FDS-202	1.14	0.2
13	3	"Bar Wars"	June 5, 2024	FDS-203	1.14	0.2
14	4	"Recipe Showdown"	June 12, 2024	FDS-204	1.05	0.1
15	5	"Partners in Wine"	June 19, 2024	FDS-205	1.01	0.2
16	6	"Mars Attacks"	June 26, 2024	FDS-206	1.09	0.1
17	7	"Show and Sell"	July 10, 2024	FDS-207	1.08	0.2
18	8	"Breakfast Bootcamp"	July 17, 2024	FDS-208	1.00	0.2
19	9	"The Semifinal"	July 24, 2024	FDS-209	1.03	0.2
20	10	"The Final: Pitch Perfect"	July 24, 2024	FDS-210	1.03	0.2

== International versions ==
=== Australia ===
Gordon Ramsay's Food Stars Australia was announced at Nine's upfronts in September 2023 and premiered on the Nine Network on March 26, 2024. The series features Gordon Ramsay and Boost Juice founder Janine Allis. The series is produced by Endemol Shine Australia (A Banijay company) and Studio Ramsay Global.

==== Contestants ====
Fourteen people were selected in the first episode to compete as contestants, in two teams of seven.

===== Gordon's team =====
Name	Age	Home town	Product	Result
Troy Benjamin	43	St Leonards, Victoria	Blak Brews	Winner April 24
Aaron Taylor	40	Point Turton, South Australia	MXTology	Runner-up April 24
Julie Kos	57	Geelong, Victoria	The Smoked Egg Company	Eliminated April 17
Ethan Yong	28	Melbourne, Victoria	Umami Papi	Eliminated April 17
Pia Hambour	35	Melbourne, Victoria	Bodega Deli	Eliminated April 17
Christiana Daaboul	27	Sydney, New South Wales	Ard (Plant-based Baklava)	Eliminated April 2
Renae Bunster	45	Perth, Western Australia	Bunsters Hot Sauces	Eliminated March 27

===== Janine's team =====
Name	Age	Home town	Product	Result
Sophie Hood	28	Bondi, New South Wales	Seoul Tonic	Winner April 24
Mason Bagios	33	Perth, Western Australia	Kommunity Brew	Runner-up April 24
Sina Klug	33	Sydney, New South Wales	Miss Sina (Vegan bakery)	Eliminated April 17
Catherine Hutchins	36	Abbotsford, Victoria	Good-Edi (Edible coffee cups)	Eliminated April 10
Karen Lindsay	60	Wamuran, Queensland	Little White Goat Cheese	Eliminated April 9
Ash Straney	32	Alexandria, New South Wales	Rude Boy Doughnuts	Eliminated April 9
Danny Nembhard	34	Scarborough, Western Australia	Wolfitbox (Dog food)	Eliminated April 3

==== Ratings ====
On January 28, 2024, OzTAM’s rating data recording system changed. Viewership data will now focus on National Reach and National Total ratings instead of the 5 metro centres and overnight shares.

No.	Title	Air date	Timeslot	National reach viewers	National total viewers	Night rank	Ref(s)
1	The Pitch	March 26, 2024	Tuesday 7:30 pm	1,712,000	581,000	3	
2	Chiko Roll	March 27, 2024	Wednesday 7:30 pm	1,310,000	459,000	5	
3	Nick Kyrgios: Alive	April 2, 2024	Tuesday 7:30 pm	1,379,000	509,000	5	
4	Ultimate Foodie	April 3, 2024	Wednesday 7:30 pm	1,356,000	431,000	5	
5	Cadbury Chocolate / Meal Kit	April 9, 2024	Tuesday 7:30 pm	1,736,000	376,000	3	
6	Vegemite to Americans	April 10, 2024	Wednesday 7:30 pm	1,213,000	411,000	9	
7	The Investors Challenge	April 17, 2024	Wednesday 7:30 pm	1,219,000	424,000	9	
8	Finale	April 24, 2024	Wednesday 7:30 pm	1,294,000	364,000	7	

== See also ==
- Gordon Ramsay's Future Food Stars
