= Studio Ramsay Global =

Division of Fox Entertainment

- Type: Division
- Industry: Television production
- Predecessor: The original incarnation of Studio Ramsay (All3Media)
- Founded: August 2021; 5 years ago
- Headquarters: Los Angeles, California, United States
- Key people: Gordon Ramsay (president)
- Products: Television programs
- Parent: Fox Entertainment Studios
- Website: Official website

Studio Ramsay Global is a division of Fox Entertainment led by Gordon Ramsay. Formed as part of an overall deal with Ramsay, the studio is focused on food and lifestyle-related programming. The studio was formed after Fox Entertainment acquired the existing Studio Ramsay from All3Media.

== Production ==
Title	Years	Notes	Network
Next Level Chef	2022–present	co-production with Fox Alternative Entertainment	Fox
Gordon Ramsay's Future Food Stars	2022–2023	co-production with Objective Media Group	BBC One
Trailblazers: A Rocky Mountain Roadtrip	2022		BBC Two
Kitchen Commando	2023	co-production with Fox Alternative Entertainment	Tubi
Gordon Ramsay's Food Stars	2023–2024	co-production with Fox Alternative Entertainment	Fox
Kitchen Nightmares	2023–present	co-production with Fox Alternative Entertainment and All3Media International	Fox
Gordon Ramsay's Secret Service	2025–present	co-production with Fox Alternative Entertainment	Fox
Next Level Baker	2025–present	co-production with Fox Alternative Entertainment	Fox
