= Richard Blais =

American chef

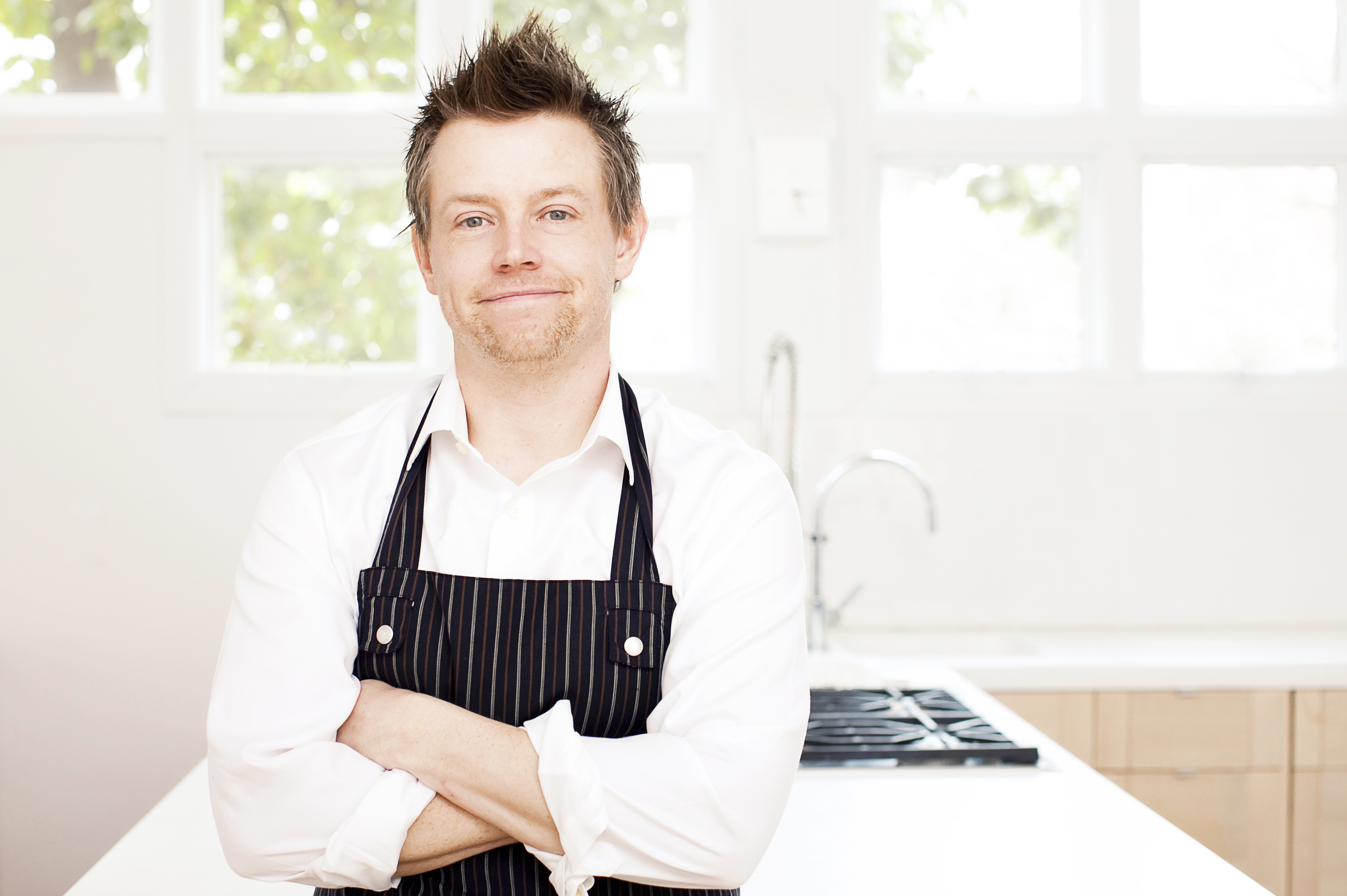
- Blais in 2011
- Born: Uniondale, New York, US
- Education: The Culinary Institute of America
- Spouse: Jazmin Blais (m. 2006)
- Children: 2
- Culinary career
- Current restaurants
- Four Flamingos (Orlando); Juniper & Ivy (San Diego); The Crack Shack (3 locations); California English (San Diego); Ember & Rye (Carlsbad)
- Television shows
- Bravo's Top Chef; Food Network's Iron Chef America; Food Network's Guy's Grocery Games; Food Network's Tournament of Champions (TV series); FOX's Next Level Chef
- Website: RichardBlais.net

Richard Blais is an American chef, television personality, restaurateur, and author. He appeared on the reality show cooking show Top Chef, and is known for his take on classic American cuisine. Blais was the runner-up for the fourth season of Top Chef and returned several seasons later to win Top Chef: All-Stars.

== Early life ==
Blais was born in Uniondale, New York. He was adopted by his stepfather in the second grade. Blais' first cooking job was in a McDonald's on Long Island, where he learned the basics of working in a kitchen.

== Career ==
Blais worked at restaurants while in college; he received the 2-year AOS in culinary arts from The Culinary Institute of America. After graduation, he was invited to complete a fellowship in the fish kitchen. He has studied under chefs Thomas Keller at The French Laundry, Daniel Boulud, and Ferran Adrià. He also trained at restaurants Chez Panisse and elBulli.

Blais relocated to Atlanta, Georgia, in 2000 to run his own restaurant called Fishbone. Initially, he was unimpressed with traditionally Southern ingredients but found ways to use them in his own style. He has founded Trail Blais, a culinary company that seeks to perform consulting, design, and operational services in Atlanta eateries.

In July 2011, Blais signed a cookbook deal with Clarkson Potter, a division of Random House. On February 26, he released his debut cookbook, Try This at Home: Recipes From My Head to Your Plate, a cookbook for home cooks to reinvent classic dishes. Try This at Home was nominated for a James Beard Foundation Award 2014 in the category of Cookbook: General Cooking. Blais later opened Juniper & Ivy with Michael Rosen in San Diego, California, his first West Coast venture. He and Rosen most recently opened Crack Shack, a fine-casual fried chicken concept with multiple locations in Southern California and Las Vegas.

On May 16, 2017, Blais released his second cookbook, So Good: 100 Recipes from My Kitchen to Yours, which features 100 elevated traditional recipes designed for the home cook.

Also in 2017, Blais began hosting a weekly podcast about the culinary industry called Starving For Attention.

In 2020, Blais and iHeartRadio launched the game-show-style podcast "Food Court with Richard Blais", which features guests including celebrity chefs, actors, writers, comedians, and other podcasters debating classic food arguments.

In 2023, Blais authored Plant Forward: 100 Bold Recipes for a Mostly Healthy Lifestyle, a plant-based diet cookbook in which dairy and meat are not abandoned entirely but the main focus is on plant dishes.

In 2024, Blais has partnered with the Hyatt Regency in Scottsdale, AZ. He will debut multiple new dining experiences as part of the Scottsdale resorts $110 million dollar renovation.

=== Top Chef ===
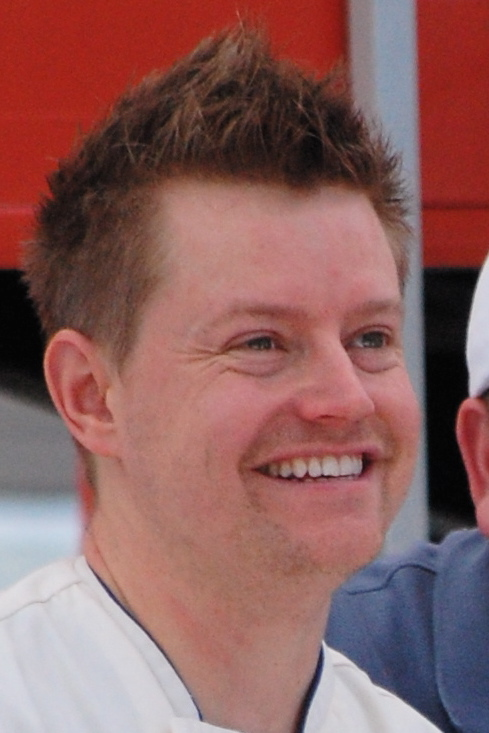
Richard Blais

Blais appeared as a contestant on the 4th season of Bravo's Top Chef. He was the runner up, losing to Stephanie Izard. In 2010, he competed in Top Chef: All-Stars and won the competition, earning the title of "Top Chef" by defeating Mike Isabella in the season finale, which aired on March 30, 2011. He was a recurring judge in seasons 12 and 13 and on Season 18, Top Chef: Portland.

=== Other television appearances ===
Blais is a regular on the Food Network, with recurring appearances on Guy's Grocery Games as a judge, and as a competitor, and has also hosted Food Network's Hungry Games, and Halloween Baking Championship. He competed in Food Network's Tournament of Champions (TV series) and the second Cutthroat Kitchen: Superstar Sabotage tournament on November 4, 2015, winning his preliminary match and advancing to the finals; he had been a recurring judge on that series since season 12. He also has a recurring role as a judge in the Masterchef and Masterchef Junior franchises. In 2015, Blais was the host of HLN's "Cook Your Ass Off", a transformational culinary contest that focused on healthy cooking competition. In 2017 he became the host of "Man v. Master," a culinary competition on the FYI Network. Richard has also appeared on various talk shows, including The Today Show, Good Morning America, The Rachael Ray Show, The Chew, Live! with Kelly and Michael, and Late Night with Jimmy Fallon. Blais had a cameo role in the 2016 feature film, Why Him?, starring James Franco and Bryan Cranston. In 2018, Blais appeared as a guest judge on Sugar Rush. He is currently a judge on Gordon Ramsay's Next Level Chef.

=== Restaurants ===
Blais is currently or has been involved with the following:

- Juniper & Ivy – An American restaurant that opened in San Diego on March 3, 2014. At Juniper & Ivy, Blais offers refined, American cuisine with a "left coast edge." The restaurant was designed by The Johnson Studio at Cooper Carry.
- The Crack Shack – Blais partnered with chef Jon Sloan and Michael Rosen on this second San Diego–based restaurant, which opened in late 2015. The restaurant "serves breakfast, lunch, and dinner via an all-day menu that revolves around chicken and eggs, from fried to grilled and everything in between."
- FLIP Burger Boutique – Blais was formerly involved with and co-founder of burger-focused restaurant FLIP Burger Boutique, with three locations in Atlanta, one in Birmingham (closed), and a location in Nashville, Tennessee (closed). Blais is no longer involved with the FLIP chain.
- Ember & Rye – Blais has been named as the chef for a restaurant scheduled to open at the Park Hyatt Aviara Resort in Carlsbad, CA. The restaurant is part of the property's $50 million renovation project.
- Four Flamingos, A Richard Blais Florida Kitchen – opened in December 2021 at Hyatt Regency Grand Cypress in Orlando, Florida.
- Kestrel, A Richard Blais Kitchen + Lounge opened in 2024 at the Indian Wells Golf Resort in California
- Tiki Taka – a Japanese and Spanish tapas style restaurant at the Grand Hyatt Scottsdale Resort in Scottsdale, Arizona.
- La Zozzona – an Italian American restaurant also located at the Grand Hyatt Scottsdale Resort. Both Scottsdale restaurants opened at the end of 2024 following the resort's $115 million renovation project. In addition to the two main restaurants, Blais helped curate the menus for four other dining areas on the property, including the poolside restaurants and lobby bar.

== Other activities ==
In November 2011, Blais ran the ING New York City marathon for Alliance for a Healthier Generation. It was his first marathon, and he completed it in 4:31:54. He has since run four other New York City marathons. In November 2017, Blais ran the TCS New York City Marathon for Room to Read.

== Personal life ==
Blais was married to Jazmin Blais in 2006. He and his wife have two daughters, Riley and Embry. The couple has authored a cookbook together.

== Works cited ==
- Blais, Richard; Colicchio, Tom (2013). Try This at Home: Recipes from My Head to Your Plate. Potter/TenSpeed/Harmony. ISBN 978-0307985286.
- Blais, Richard (2017). So Good: 100 Recipes from My Kitchen to Yours. Houghton Mifflin Harcourt. ISBN 978-0544663091.
