= Next Level Chef (American TV series) =

American reality television series

- Genre: Reality competition; Culinary
- Directed by: Paul Starkman (2022); Paul Newton (2023)
- Presented by: Gordon Ramsay
- Starring: Nyesha Arrington; Richard Blais
- Country of origin: United States
- Original language: English
- No. of seasons: 5
- No. of episodes: 72

Production
- Executive producers: Gordon Ramsay; Matt Cahoon; Lisa Edwards
- Producer: Evangeline Bristow
- Camera setup: Multi-camera
- Running time: 43 minutes
- Production companies: Fox Alternative Entertainment; Studio Ramsay Global

Original release
- Network: Fox
- Release: January 2, 2022 – present

Related
- Next Level Baker

Next Level Chef is an American culinary reality competition television series that premiered on Fox on January 2, 2022, with judges Gordon Ramsay, Nyesha Arrington, and Richard Blais. In February 2025, the series was renewed for a fifth and sixth season, with the fifth season premiering in January 2026. A holiday spin-off, Next Level Baker, premiered in December 2025.

== Format ==
In Next Level Chef, contestants compete in a series of themed cooking challenges, as they are divided into three teams under the guidance and judgment of chefs Ramsay, Arrington, and Blais. The contestants are tasked with cooking in one of three on-set kitchens, stacked on top of each other and accessible by elevator. Each kitchen differs in terms of equipment quality — the top level is equipped with the most modern and expensive equipment, the middle level is a standard commercial kitchen, and the bottom level or basement contains a limited selection of low-quality equipment. All the kitchens are linked by an elevator, and a moving platform which travels between floors, which is equipped with LED lights and a buzzer.

At the start of the season, the judges divide the contestants into teams, represented by colored aprons (red for Arrington, blue for Blais, and yellow for Ramsay). Each team is assigned a kitchen to cook in, with their respective judge accompanying them in the kitchen to observe their cooking and offer advice as needed.

In the middle of the season, once at least half of the contestants have been eliminated, the remaining cooks will compete as individuals, with the goal of making it to the finals. Only three cooks will be selected to compete for the prize.

At the end of the competition, the top three cooks will compete in a 90-minute endurance round, cooking three courses across all three kitchens (one in each). The contestants are allowed to divide the 90 minutes however they wish across all their dishes. At the last cook, the judges stagger the timing for contestants to grab ingredients based on who has more time left, so that all the contestants will finish their cooking at the same time. Judging of dishes occurs in between rounds. Once all the rounds are completed, the judges will deliberate and announce the winning chef for the season.

The winner receives a prize of US$250,000, and an opportunity to work professionally with chefs Ramsay, Arrington and Blais in their restaurants for a year, receiving further mentorship and training to grow their own culinary skills.

=== Cooking ===
At the start of each challenge, contestants line up against the far wall of their respective kitchens to wait for the platform. The platform will then descend with ingredients for the contestants to choose from and use in their dishes. The platform lights flash red while it is in motion, and will change to green when it is stationary. Once the light goes green, contestants must run to the platform and grab ingredients to use in the round. The platform will remain stationary for 30 seconds before beginning to move again. The construction of the set means that chefs in the top level will receive first pick of available ingredients, while chefs in the basement must work with whatever ingredients are left. Contestants are allowed to attempt to take ingredients even as the platform leaves their floor. If any ingredients fall from the platform onto a particular floor, any contestant on that floor is allowed to grab that ingredient for use in their dish.

Once all contestants return to their stations, they are given a time limit to prepare, cook and plate their dish. At the end of the round, the platform will return to collect all dishes for judging, beginning with the basement and ending with the top level. Contestants must place their dishes anywhere on the platform in order for it to be judged. If a contestant misses the platform, their dish will not be judged against the others.

Halfway through the round, the judges may announce surprises for the contestants. The platform will descend with an additional themed ingredient which contestants must incorporate into their current dish for presentation, often complementary to the main theme of the challenge.

=== Judging ===
After the challenge is completed, the contestants assemble for the judging. Each judge will present the dishes from their team without revealing who has cooked what to their fellow judges, who will judge the dish based on appearance and taste. At the end of the judging round, the judges will announce winning dishes. The chef who cooked the winning dish will earn immunity from elimination for themselves. In the group phase of the challenge, a chef with a winning dish will also earn immunity from elimination for their entire team.

The judges will also choose losing dishes from each of their teams. Each judge will choose one contestant from their team to face elimination. If a contestant fails to place their dish on the platform, they are immediately considered for elimination.

=== Elimination ===
To determine which of the bottom two contestants will be eliminated, both contestants will participate in a themed head-to-head duel, supported by their respective teams.

Both contestants will cook one dish in the top level kitchen, guided by the mentor of the winning team for that episode. At the end of the cooking, the other two judges are called in to judge the dishes without knowing who has cooked what, based on the same criteria as the main judging round. From there, they will vote on which contestant will be eliminated from the competition. In the event of a tie, the judge from the winning team will cast the tiebreaking vote.

== Variations across seasons ==
Certain elements of the competition have changed across seasons, from the drafting to the assignment of kitchens.

=== Season 1 ===
In the first season, the contestants were divided into three groups at the start of the first episode, and randomly assigned a kitchen to work in and a mentor to observe them. Based on their evaluation of the chefs' dishes, the mentors then took turn to choose contestants to form their teams. In subsequent episodes of the season, teams would choose a keycard at random from the judges' table, which would bring them to one of the kitchens to cook in.

=== Season 2 ===
In the second season, the contestants were drafted immediately at the start of the season, and assigned a kitchen to cook in at random. For subsequent episodes, contestants would be assigned their kitchen based on their performance in the previous round. The winning team or individual would cook in the top level. Teams whose members survived elimination, or contestants with average performance, would cook in the middle kitchen. Lastly, teams who lost members to elimination, or contestants with poor performances in the previous round, would cook in the basement. Teams and contestants would move across all kitchens over the course of the competition.

This season also introduced two advantages: immunity pins and time tokens, awarded to top performing competitors across the competition. Immunity pins were awarded early in the team phase to the top performers on each team. Chefs were allowed to turn in this pin if they are chosen for a head-to-head challenge later in the season, forcing their mentor to nominate another chef in their place. Pins expired upon reaching the individual phase of the competition, and any unused pins were returned to the judges.

Time tokens were awarded during the individual phase of the competition. This allowed contestants to grant themselves an extra ten seconds to choose ingredients (before other contestants on their floor), or to deduct ten seconds from a rival's time to choose ingredients. Contestants would have to use the token on the subsequent round of competition.

=== Season 3 ===
In the third season, the contestants were divided into three distinct categories: professional chefs, social media chefs, and home cooks. Each group would compete in an audition round, with one episode at the start of the season dedicated to each category of chef. Eight of each contestant would participate in the audition, with only five making it to the draft and the main phase of the competition.

This season also had a challenge in which the platform did not remain stationary for contestants cooking in the top and middle kitchens. Only contestants in the basement had the platform remain stationary for them to grab ingredients. Contestants in the top and middle floors were allowed to grab ingredients on both instances during which the platform went past their floor. The platform also descended and ascended multiple times during the round, allowing chefs several chances to grab the ingredients they needed.

=== Season 4 ===
In the fourth season, a challenge was posed during the team phase which involved all members having an equal stake in the results. Teams would have to work with their mentors to create, cook and present a five-course menu on their floor, and all the dishes would be judged as one cohesive set of courses. The judges also cooked on the show for the first time, creating the desserts to accompany the appetizers and main courses.

== Production ==
On May 17, 2021, it was announced that Fox had ordered the series, with Gordon Ramsay as a mentor, who also serves as an executive producer. Nyesha Arrington and Richard Blais also serve as mentors for the series, the latter replacing Gino D'Acampo. On October 19, 2021, it was announced that the series would premiere on January 2, 2022.

On March 2, 2022, it was announced that Fox renewed the series for a second season, prior to the airing of the first season's finale on the same day. On May 16, 2022, it was announced that the second season would premiere on February 12, 2023 as the Super Bowl LVII lead-out program. On May 11, 2023, it was announced that the show was given a two-season order for a third and fourth season. On November 21, 2023, it was announced that the third season would premiere on January 28, 2024, following the NFC Championship football game.

The first two seasons of the show were produced on a set constructed in Las Vegas. The set, built within an industrial tent, consists of three kitchens that are stacked on top of each other. Many aspects of the set, including the burners, ranges, and generators, are all run on gas. Starting with the third season, the show was produced at Ashford Studios in County Wicklow, Ireland.

On February 27, 2025, it was announced that Next Level Chef was renewed for a fifth and sixth season. It was also revealed that a spinoff show, Next Level Baker, was in the works and would premiere on December 4, 2025.

== Episodes ==
=== Series overview ===
| Season | Contestants | Episodes | Originally released | | Winner | Runner(s)-up |
| Season | Contestants | Episodes | First released | Last released | Winner | Runner(s)-up |
|---|---|---|---|---|---|---|
| 1 | 15 | 11 | January 2, 2022 | March 2, 2022 | Stephanie "Pyet" Despain | Mariah Scott & Reuel Vincent |
| 2 | 18 | 15 | February 12, 2023 | May 11, 2023 | Tucker Ricchio | Pilar Omega & Christopher Spinosa |
| 3 | 15 (after auditions) | 16 | January 28, 2024 | May 9, 2024 | Gabi Chappel | Zach Laidlaw & Christina Miros |
| 4 | 15 (after auditions) | 14 | February 13, 2025 | May 15, 2025 | Austin Beckett | Beatrice Heirigs & Megan Keno |
| 5 | 15 (after auditions) | 16 | January 29, 2026 | May 21, 2026 | Darian Bryan | Connor Caine & Cole Lawson |

=== Season 1 (2022) ===
| No. overall | No. in season | Title | Original release date | Prod. code | U.S. viewers (millions) |
|---|---|---|---|---|---|
| 1 | 1 | "Welcome to the Next Level" | January 2, 2022 | NLC-101 | 5.08 |
| 2 | 2 | "High Steaks" | January 5, 2022 | NLC-102 | 1.84 |
| 3 | 3 | "Infinite Pastabilities" | January 12, 2022 | NLC-103 | 1.91 |
| 4 | 4 | "Fowl Play" | January 19, 2022 | NLC-104 | 1.85 |
| 5 | 5 | "The Next Level Burger" | January 26, 2022 | NLC-105 | 2.07 |
| 6 | 6 | "Drop In for Brunch" | January 30, 2022 | NLC-106 | 8.11 |
| 7 | 7 | "A Seafood Tower" | February 2, 2022 | NLC-107 | 2.11 |
| 8 | 8 | "When Pigs Fly" | February 9, 2022 | NLC-108 | 1.75 |
| 9 | 9 | "Fusion Confusion" | February 16, 2022 | NLC-109 | 1.88 |
| 10 | 10 | "Show Stopping Semi-Finals" | February 23, 2022 | NLC-110 | 1.89 |
| 11 | 11 | "The Final Level" | March 2, 2022 | NLC-111 | 1.85 |

=== Season 2 (2023) ===
| No. overall | No. in season | Title | Original release date | Prod. code | U.S. viewers (millions) |
|---|---|---|---|---|---|
| 12 | 1 | "A Next Level Welcome" | February 12, 2023 | NLC-201 | 15.66 |
| 13 | 2 | "Party Like a Guac Star" | February 16, 2023 | NLC-202 | 1.93 |
| 14 | 3 | "No Pain, No Grain" | February 23, 2023 | NLC-203 | 2.08 |
| 15 | 4 | "Rice Guys Finish Last" | March 2, 2023 | NLC-204 | 2.02 |
| 16 | 5 | "Game Time" | March 9, 2023 | NLC-205 | 1.80 |
| 17 | 6 | "Sugar and Tea and Rum" | March 16, 2023 | NLC-206 | 1.97 |
| 18 | 7 | "Here Fishy, Fishy" | March 23, 2023 | NLC-207 | 2.00 |
| 19 | 8 | "Going Global" | March 30, 2023 | NLC-208 | 1.80 |
| 20 | 9 | "Happy Hour" | April 6, 2023 | NLC-209 | 1.98 |
| 21 | 10 | "That's What Cheese Said" | April 13, 2023 | NLC-210 | 1.75 |
| 22 | 11 | "Fry Me a River" | April 20, 2023 | NLC-211 | 1.90 |
| 23 | 12 | "Bake It 'til You Make It" | April 27, 2023 | NLC-212 | 1.76 |
| 24 | 13 | "Surf and Turf" | May 4, 2023 | NLC-213 | 1.81 |
| 25 | 14 | "Made in America" | May 11, 2023 | NLC-214 | 1.85 |
| 26 | 15 | "Next Level Finale" | May 11, 2023 | NLC-215 | 1.65 |

=== Season 3 (2024) ===
| No. overall | No. in season | Title | Original release date | Prod. code | U.S. viewers (millions) |
|---|---|---|---|---|---|
| 27 | 1 | "Auditions - Social Media" | January 28, 2024 | NLC-302 | 7.24 |
| 28 | 2 | "Auditions - Home Cooks" | February 1, 2024 | NLC-303 | 2.03 |
| 29 | 3 | "Auditions - Pros" | February 8, 2024 | NLC-301 | 2.11 |
| 30 | 4 | "The Draft/Smash Bash" | February 15, 2024 | NLC-304 | 2.09 |
| 31 | 5 | "Curry in a Hurry" | February 22, 2024 | NLC-305 | 1.93 |
| 32 | 6 | "80 Degrees and Palm Trees" | February 29, 2024 | NLC-306 | 2.02 |
| 33 | 7 | "On the Go" | March 7, 2024 | NLC-307 | 1.86 |
| 34 | 8 | "Don't Have a Cow, Man" | March 14, 2024 | NLC-308 | 1.76 |
| 35 | 9 | "You Wanna Pizza Me?" | March 21, 2024 | NLC-309 | 1.82 |
| 36 | 10 | "It's All Greek to Me" | March 28, 2024 | NLC-310 | 1.72 |
| 37 | 11 | "Squad Goals" | April 4, 2024 | NLC-311 | 1.93 |
| 38 | 12 | "Bingo, Bango, Bento!" | April 11, 2024 | NLC-312 | 1.82 |
| 39 | 13 | "Picture Perfect" | April 18, 2024 | NLC-313 | 1.98 |
| 40 | 14 | "Kombucha Kulture" | April 25, 2024 | NLC-314 | 1.79 |
| 41 | 15 | "Taste of Success" | May 2, 2024 | NLC-315 | 1.72 |
| 42 | 16 | "The Final Level" | May 9, 2024 | NLC-316 | 1.76 |

=== Season 4 (2025) ===
| No. overall | No. in season | Title | Original release date | Prod. code | U.S. viewers (millions) |
|---|---|---|---|---|---|
| 43 | 1 | "Social Media Chef Auditions" | February 13, 2025 | NLC-401 | 1.83 |
| 44 | 2 | "Home Chef Auditions" | February 20, 2025 | NLC-402 | 1.71 |
| 45 | 3 | "Pro Chef Auditions" | February 27, 2025 | NLC-403 | 1.65 |
| 46 | 4 | "Ciao Down" | March 6, 2025 | NLC-404 | 1.69 |
| 47 | 5 | "Grills Gone Wild" | March 13, 2025 | NLC-405 | 1.60 |
| 48 | 6 | "Shoyu my Ramen" | March 20, 2025 | NLC-406 | 1.78 |
| 49 | 7 | "The Menu" | March 27, 2025 | NLC-407 | 1.71 |
| 50 | 8 | "Beat the Heat" | April 3, 2025 | NLC-408 | 1.68 |
| 51 | 9 | "The Thunderdome" | April 10, 2025 | NLC-409 | 1.75 |
| 52 | 10 | "A Very Special O' Cajun" | April 17, 2025 | NLC-410 | 1.94 |
| 53 | 11 | "Tapas In" | April 24, 2025 | NLC-411 | 1.61 |
| 54 | 12 | "Bad to the Bone" | May 1, 2025 | NLC-412 | 1.66 |
| 55 | 13 | "Always Crust Your Instincts" | May 8, 2025 | NLC-413 | 1.72 |
| 56 | 14 | "Final Level" | May 15, 2025 | NLC-414 | 1.70 |

=== Season 5 (2026) ===
| No. overall | No. in season | Title | Original release date | Prod. code | U.S. viewers (millions) |
|---|---|---|---|---|---|
| 57 | 1 | "Auditions - Pro Chefs" | January 29, 2026 | NLC-501 | N/A |
| 58 | 2 | "Auditions - Social Media Chefs" | February 5, 2026 | NLC-502 | N/A |
| 59 | 3 | "Auditions - Home Chefs" | February 12, 2026 | NLC-503 | N/A |
| 60 | 4 | "The Draft/Taco Party" | February 19, 2026 | NLC-504 | N/A |
| 61 | 5 | "Sea Monsters" | February 26, 2026 | NLC-505 | N/A |
| 62 | 6 | "Bowl in One" | March 5, 2026 | NLC-506 | N/A |
| 63 | 7 | "Service, Please!" | March 12, 2026 | NLC-507 | N/A |
| 64 | 8 | "Mini Gordon" | March 19, 2026 | NLC-508 | N/A |
| 65 | 9 | "Ale's Well That Ends Well" | April 2, 2026 | NLC-509 | N/A |
| 66 | 10 | "Cowboy Cooking" | April 9, 2026 | NLC-510 | N/A |
| 67 | 11 | "The In-Season Tournament" | April 16, 2026 | NLC-511 | N/A |
| 68 | 12 | "Use Your Noodle" | April 23, 2026 | NLC-512 | N/A |
| 69 | 13 | "A Toast to America's 250th" | April 30, 2026 | NLC-513 | N/A |
| 70 | 14 | "The Ultimate Goal" | May 7, 2026 | NLC-514 | N/A |
| 71 | 15 | "Building a Legacy" | May 14, 2026 | NLC-515 | N/A |
| 72 | 16 | "The Final Level" | May 21, 2026 | NLC-516 | N/A |

== Next Level Baker ==
On February 27, 2025, it was announced that a spin-off show, Next Level Baker, was in development. The series premiered on December 4, 2025.

== International versions ==
A British version of the show was commissioned by ITV in June 2022. It later premiered on January 11, 2023. Gordon Ramsay and Nyesha Arrington from the American version served as mentors, along with Paul Ainsworth. The show was won by social media chef Jade Greenhalgh. On March 28, 2023, the show was reportedly canceled after one season.

A French version of the show was commissioned by Kitchen Factory Productions in October 2022.

A Spanish version premiered on Telecinco on January 8, 2025.

A Brazilian version premiered on TV Globo on July 15, 2025. It is hosted by Ana Maria Braga, with Alex Atala, Jefferson Rueda and Renata Vanzetto serving as mentors.

Legend
| Currently airing season |
| Franchise no longer in production |
| Upcoming season announced |
| Status of season/franchise unknown |

| Country/Region | Name | Network | Premiere | Host | Winner(s) |
|---|---|---|---|---|---|
| Brazil | Chef de Alto Nível | TV Globo | July 15, 2025 | Ana Maria Braga | Season 1, 2025: Luiz Lira; Season 2, 2026: Current Season |
| France | Next Level Chef | M6 | 2025 | Cyril Lignac | Season 1, 2026: Upcoming Season |
| Spain | Next Level Chef | Telecinco | January 8, 2025 | Blanca Romero | Season 1, 2025: Jaime Caffarena |
| United Kingdom | Next Level Chef | ITV | January 11, 2023 | Gordon Ramsay | Season 1, 2023: Jade Greenhalgh |
