= Nyesha Arrington =

American chef

- Born: Nyesha Joyce Arrington; 1981 (age 44–45); California, United States
- Known for: Chef, television personality, restaurateur
- Culinary career
- Previous restaurants
- Native, Santa Monica, California (2017–2019) Leona, Venice Beach, California (2016–2017)
- Website: www.nyeshaarrington.com

Nyesha Joyce Arrington (born 1981) is an American chef, television personality, and restaurateur. She was a contestant on Top Chef: Texas season 9; and has been on various television shows, including as a mentor and judge on Fox's Next Level Chef. Arrington formerly was a chef and partner at restaurants Leona, and Native in Southern California. She is nicknamed "The Ninja".

== Biography ==
Nyesha Joyce Arrington was born in Southern California. She is multiracial including Black, and her maternal grandmother was Korean.

In 2011, Arrington was a contestant on Top Chef: Texas season 9. In 2012, she was named by Zagat as one of the "30 Under 30". In her early career she cooked under chef Josiah Citrin at Mélisse, followed by serving as executive chef at Wilshire Restaurant in Santa Monica, California. Arrington was awarded Eater LA's chef of the year in 2015.

Arrington was a chef and partner at Leona in the Venice neighborhood of Los Angeles, California, from 2016 to 2017. She opened Native in Santa Monica, California, where she was chef and partner from 2017 until 2019.

Fox's television series Next Level Chef premiered in January 2022, with Arrington serving as a mentor and judge. The show was renewed for a fourth season.

In 2023, she was one of the chefs who cooked for World Central Kitchen's Feeding Hope dinner in Los Angeles.
