= List of assets owned by Fox Corporation =

This is a list of assets owned by the mass media company Fox Corporation.

== Fox Entertainment ==
- Fox Broadcasting Company
  - Fox (Mexico)
  - Animation Domination
- Bento Box Entertainment
  - Princess Bento Studio (JV with Princess Pictures)
  - Sutikki
  - Bento Box Interactive
- Fox Alternative Entertainment
- Holywater (equity stake)
- Meet Cute
- Studio Ramsay Global
- XOF Productions
- MarVista Entertainment
  - Tideline Entertainment
- Fox First Run
- Fox Entertainment Studios
- Fox Entertainment Animation
- Fox Entertainment Global
- Fox Studios
  - Fox Studio Lot

== Fox Television Stations ==
- 28 regional owned-and-operated stations
- LiveNow from Fox
- MyNetworkTV
- Fox Soul
- Fox Local
- Foxnet (available in some Fox stations)

== Fox News Media ==
- Fox News
  - Fox News International
- Fox Business
  - Fox Business International
- Fox News Radio
- Fox News Talk (radio)
- Fox Nation
- Fox Weather

== Fox Sports Media Group ==
- Fox Sports
  - FS1
  - FS2
  - Fox Deportes (Spanish language)
  - Fox Sports Argentina (brand licensing agreement with Mediapro)
  - Big Ten Network (61%)
  - Fox Soccer Plus
- Fox Sports Racing
- Fox Sports Radio (brand licensing agreement with iHeartMedia/Premiere Networks)
- Fox Sports Interactive Media
  - OutKick

== Fox Digital Platforms ==
- Fox.com
- Foxsports.com
- myFoxHurricane.com – a website related to weather launched in 2008.
- LiveNOW from Fox, a streaming channel
- MyNetworkTV.com
- FoxNewsInternational.com
- TMZ
- Fox, a Mexican sports television channel.
- Fox One, a streaming service
- Tubi
  - Tubi Kids (kids hub of Tubi)
- AdRise
- Credible Labs (67%)
- Blockchain Creative Labs
- Red Seat Ventures
- Roku, Inc.
  - Roku
  - Frndly TV
  - Howdy
  - The Roku Channel
  - Roku OS
  - Roku City

== Other assets ==
- Fox Sports Grill (50%) – Upscale sports bar and restaurant with 7 locations: Scottsdale, Arizona; Irvine, California; Seattle; Plano, Texas; Houston; San Diego; and Atlanta.
- Fox Sports Skybox (70%) – Sports fans' Bar & Grill at Staples Center and six airport restaurants.
- Flutter Entertainment (2.6%)
  - FanDuel (17.6%)
- National Spring Football League Enterprises (JV with Brian Woods prior to 2023, with Dany Garcia, Dwayne Johnson and RedBird Capital Partners from 2024, with Impact Capital from 2026)
  - United Football League (2024) (plurality stake)
- Penske Entertainment Corp. (33% with Penske Corporation)
  - INDYCAR, LLC (Motorsports sanctioning body; parent company of the IndyCar Series)
  - Indianapolis Motor Speedway (2.5-mile race track in Speedway, Indiana)
    - Indianapolis Motor Speedway Radio Network
  - IMS Productions, Inc. (broadcast television production company with satellite trucks, TV trucks and audio/visual editing facilities)
  - Grand Prix Association of Long Beach (promoter of the Grand Prix of Long Beach in Long Beach, California)
  - Detroit Grand Prix, Inc. (promoter of the Detroit Grand Prix in Detroit, Michigan)

== Former assets ==
=== Sold ===
- The Spring League (minority stake, 2020–2021)

=== Defunct ===
- Fox Bet
- Fox Now
- United States Football League (2022–2023)

== See also ==
- Lists of corporate assets
- List of assets owned by News Corp
- News Corp
- 21st Century Fox
