= Roku OS =

- Roku OS home screen
- Developer: Roku, Inc.
- Written in: C, BrightScript, SceneGraph
- OS family: Linux on embedded systems
- Working state: Current
- Released to manufacturing: 2004
- Latest release: 15.3 / August 13, 2026; 2 months ago
- Marketing target: Streaming television
- Available in: English, French, German, Portuguese, Spanish
- Update method: Over-the-air update
- Package manager: ropm
- Supported platforms: List: ARM Cortex-A53; ARM Cortex-A55; ARM Cortex A35; ARM quad core 1 GHz; ARM dual core 1.2 GHz; ARM quad core CA73 1 GHz; MIPS 900 MHz
- Kernel type: Monolithic (Linux)
- Default user interface: Graphical (Multi-touch)
- License: Proprietary
- Official website: www.roku.com/how-it-works/roku-os

Roku OS is a Linux-based operating system software developed by Roku, Inc. It has powered consumer electronics products such as Roku-branded streaming players and TVs since 2004. The Roku OS is the most popular TV operating system in the U.S., reaching an estimated 90 million households as of 2025.

The Roku OS works as a streaming platform which hosts both free and paid streaming channels through its graphical user interface. The operating system initially powered Roku's streaming players in 2004, extended support for smart TVs in 2014, and since also to Roku-branded home entertainment devices such as smart speakers, as of 2023.

== History ==
=== 2004–2013: Origin as a media player OS ===
In January 2004, Roku's digital media player, called HD1000, was powered by the Roku OS. The Roku OS was reportedly based on Linux with kernel version 2.4.18, and leveraged open-source software, including Samba, Busybox, jpeglib, and zlib. The Roku OS also accompanied a C/C++ based software development kit (SDK), for its media player, in order to provide a development environment supporting Windows, Mac, or Linux-based hosts.

=== 2014–2017: Extension to smart TVs ===
According to a news report in August 2014, The Roku OS featured on a Hisense TV model. Later, in June 2015, it was reported that the operating system powered an Insignia TV model. In October 2015, Roku announced the release of Roku OS 7. This release allowed television viewers using Roku’s streaming devices to "follow" actors, directors, as well as TV shows and films. In June 2016, Roku OS 7.2 was launched, followed by a Roku OS 8 release announcement in October 2017. The latter operating system release featured single sign-on for paid TV customers and integration of TV programming from over-the-air TV, among other updates.

=== 2018–2021: New features, vulnerabilities ===
In June 2018, WIRED wrote that Roku devices running Roku OS 8.0 or lower were found to be vulnerable to a type of web attack known as DNS rebinding. The WIRED article also cited Roku as saying that it had created a software patch in response, and was rolling out the patch to its customers.

April 2019 saw the release of Roku OS 9.1 adding "automatic account linking" (sparing users from re-entering login credentials previously entered on a Roku streaming device or TV), genre search, smarter voice control and other features.

In April 2021, Roku announced the release of Roku OS 10, which featured "instant resume" for streaming channels, automatic configuration for gaming consoles, AirPlay 2 and HomeKit support to Roku HD streaming boxes and TVs etc. In May 2021, Engadget reported on an "exploit" which took advantage of two vulnerabilities, in Roku OS versions lower than 10, to enable a "persistent root jailbreak" on Roku devices. The exploit gave users control over what channels they installed. Roku stated in response that it had mitigated the vulnerabilities by updating Roku OS 9.4.

=== 2022–present: Usage growth ===
In March 2022, Roku announced Roku OS 11, adding new audio options, custom photo screensavers and more.

In March 2023, the Roku OS was reported to have 70 million active accounts and to have led the US smart TV and streaming device sector in 2022. In October 2023, Roku announced Roku OS 12.5, which focused on sports, live TV, and easier content discovery.

In April 2024, the Roku OS was reported to be the TV operating system with the largest share of TVs sold in the U.S. and Mexico during January-March 2024, accounting for approximately 40% of sales in each country. In the same month, Roku OS 13 was released. The OS update was announced for all Roku TV models and many Roku streaming players. The update was said to offer enhancements to content discovery, browsing and other features including auto-adjusted picture modes and personalized "backdrops".

In September 2024, Roku announced the release of Roku OS 14. This update featured a new "Kid & Family zone" added to the home screen, an ability to give a thumbs up or thumbs down to content and an option to use voice commands to update smart TV settings, among other changes. Starting on 29-Sep-2024 when OS 14 was deployed, many Tablo 4th Generation DVRs either could no longer play at all, or after settings adjustments, would play but without any audio. As of 1-Nov-2024, this issue remains unresolved.

In January 2025, Roku said that the Roku OS was the leading TV OS in the U.S., Canada and Mexico, reaching over 90 million streaming households. That same month, a new update to the operating system was rolled out, bringing Roku OS to version 14.1. This update included bug fixes and performance enhancements, but was described as potentially "underwhelming" for users expecting new features or a visual overhaul.

In October 2025, Roku OS 15.0 was released to a small group of Roku device owners. This update aimed at improving system performance through "code optimizations" such as nullifying JSON data processing inefficiencies, removing data management redundancies, and refining the use of Roku's in-house BrightScript programming language. The expected benefits for the users included faster app loading times, more responsive user interface, and a leaner operating system in general.

== Features ==
The Roku OS is a Linux-based streaming platform which runs "free channels" and "subscription channels". The operating system powers Roku TVs, streaming devices and smart speakers. According to Roku, the operating system is able to run on "low power chips" using small memory footprints. The operating system has been reported to be simple and easy to set up and use, yet powerful.

=== Roku Channel Store ===
The Roku OS includes the Roku Channel Store, featuring a collection of apps Roku calls "channels". The operating system allows users to browse streaming channels available, displayed in a grid format. According to mobile app analytics company 42matters, there were over 26,000 apps available in the Roku Channel Store in 2023. Examples of "free channels" available in the store are The Roku Channel, Tubi, Fox One, Amazon Freevee, Xumo, NBC, ABC, PBS, CBS, Pluto TV and Kiddoodle.tv, whereas the "subscription channels" include Howdy, Netflix, Amazon Prime Video, Hayu, Paramount+, BET+, Curiosity Stream, Eros Now, AMC+, Acorn TV, Shudder, DAZN, Mubi, HBO Max, Discovery+, Crunchyroll, SonyLIV, ZEE5, Hotstar, Disney+, Hulu, Sun NXT, Hallmark+, Peacock, Kidoodle.TV and iWant.

=== Roku Media Player ===
Roku Media Player, which is part of Roku OS, is built to play local media content streamed from a DLNA server, such as Twonky or Windows Media Player, or (for compatible models) content from an inserted USB device, such as a pen drive.

=== User features ===
The Roku OS offers content search, voice control, parental controls, and custom photo screensavers. It also features a "guest mode", "private listening" (using Bluetooth headphones), "continue watching", and "screen mirroring" which allows to mirror a smartphone or computer screen to the Roku device, supporting both Miracast and AirPlay protocols. The operating system also includes "Roku City", a screensaver Roku utilizes for advertising.

=== Developer tools ===
According to Roku, the Roku OS integrates tools which allow the company's channel publishers and advertisers to measure the effectiveness of online video advertisements delivered by the company. Roku OS 10.5 or higher supports an "independent developer kit" (IDK), built for Roku devices, which Roku says allows developers to create not only streaming channels but also other applications.

== Compatibility ==
Consumer products running the Roku OS include:

- Roku's streaming devices such as the Roku Ultra
- Roku-branded TVs from Aiwa, Daewoo, Element Electronics, Haier, Hisense, InFocus, Insignia, JVC, LG, Magnavox, Philips, Panasonic, Polaroid, RCA, Roku, Sansui, Sanyo, Sharp, TCL, Walmart's Atvio and Onn, Westinghouse, Hitachi, HKPRO, Metz, and Toshiba
- Roku-branded home entertainment devices, including smart speakers

== See also ==
- Fire OS, a mobile operating system developed by Amazon for its streaming devices, smart TVs and other devices
- Google TV (operating system), from Google, co-developed by Intel, Sony and Logitech
- tvOS, an operating system developed by Apple for its streaming device Apple TV
- Tizen, a Linux-based operating system from Samsung Electronics for its smart TVs and other devices
- webOS, a Linux-based multitasking operating system from LG for its smart TVs and other devices
