= Roku, Inc. =

American technology company

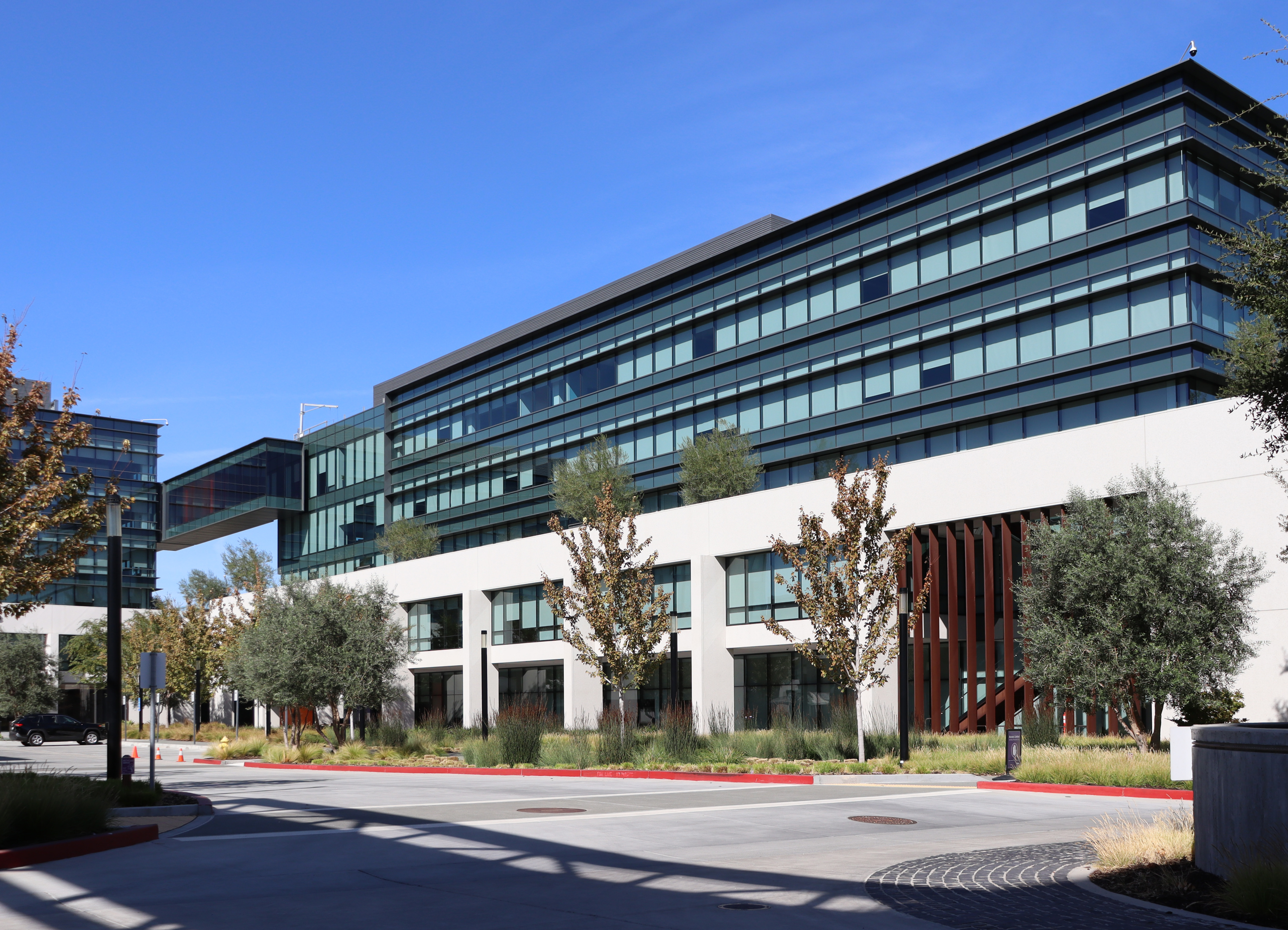
- One of four buildings at current San Jose headquarters
- Type: Subsidiary
- Traded as: Nasdaq: ROKU
- ISIN: US77543R1023
- Industry: Consumer electronics; Streaming television; Television advertising
- Founded: October 2002; 24 years ago
- Founder: Anthony Wood
- Headquarters: San Jose, California, U.S.
- Area served: List of areas: North America; Latin America; Australia; France; Germany; United Kingdom
- Key people: Anthony Wood (chair, CEO); Dan Jedda (CFO, COO); Charlie Collier (president, Roku Media); Mustafa Ozgen (president, devices)
- Products: List of products: Roku Streaming Players; Roku TVs; The Roku Channel; Roku Smart Home; Roku Streambars; Roku OS; Roku City; Howdy; Frndly TV
- Services: Streaming TV distribution; Streaming TV advertising; Smart home monitoring
- Revenue: ▲US$4.74 billion (2025)
- Operating income: ▲US$−5.6 million (2025)
- Net income: ▲US$88.4 million (2025)
- Total assets: ▲US$4.43 billion (2025)
- Total equity: ▲US$2.66 billion (2025)
- Owner: Fox Corporation
- Members: ▲100mn households; ▲145mn people; (2026)
- Number of employees: 3,600 (2025)
- Divisions: Devices (hardware); Platform (services)
- Website: roku.com

Roku, Inc. (/ˈroʊkuː/ ROH-koo) is an American company that produces streaming devices and TVs, distributes streaming services and operates an ad business on its platform. It is the U.S. market leader in streaming video distribution, reaching nearly half of U.S. broadband households as of 2026. The company also operates in Australia, Canada, France, Germany, the U.K., and Latin America.

Roku Inc. was founded in 2002 by Anthony Wood and in its initial years, Roku focused on making high-definition video players, using Roku OS since 2004, and in 2008, Roku launched the first connected TV device to stream Netflix. Later, in 2014, the company expanded the reach of its streaming platform by partnering with TV manufacturers to license Roku's technology. This allowed Roku OS to get pre-installed on smart TVs. Roku has since added channel subscriptions to its platform, while also serving targeted and performance-based ads. In addition, it operates its own ad-supported streaming service and produces consumer electronic products such as smart speakers and smart home devices. The company was listed on the Nasdaq Global Select Market from 2017 to 2026, when it was acquired by Fox Corporation.

== History ==
=== 2002–2007: Early years ===
Roku was founded in October 2002 as a limited liability company (LLC), by ReplayTV founder Anthony Wood. Roku (六), meaning "six" in the Japanese language, represented the fact that Roku was the sixth company Wood started. The company was founded as a maker of high-definition video players, with the HD1000 being the first digital media player to use Roku OS, and was funded by Wood himself with money he had earned from selling other businesses, including ReplayTV.

=== 2008–2013: Funding, initial product ===
In 2008, Netflix invested $6 million in Roku as part of an equity funding round. Netflix's association with Roku also involved Wood taking a part-time job at Netflix to make a device to stream Netflix while serving as Roku's CEO. Roku launched the first connected TV device to stream Netflix in May 2008, and continued to sell devices that plug into TVs, allowing consumers to access streaming services. In the same year, Roku's headquarters moved to Saratoga, California, further south in Silicon Valley. A round of venture capital funding from Menlo Ventures was announced in October 2008. Another round of about $8.4 million was disclosed in 2009. This year also saw Netflix sell all of its Roku shares, translating to nearly 15% of Roku's equity, to Menlo Ventures to avoid the perception of potentially favoring one streaming distribution manufacturer over another.

=== 2014–2016: Smart TV entry ===
In 2012, The Verge reported that Roku had launched in the U.K. and Canada. In 2014, Roku expanded its reach by partnering with TV manufacturers as Roku's licensees, to sell Roku's operating system already installed on smart TVs. In 2015, the company launched its products in Australia, France and Mexico. It also announced that it would be sub-leasing the buildings in Los Gatos, California from Netflix. In the same year, towards measuring the success of its advertising efforts success, Roku partnered with Nielsen, a company that specializes in advertising effectiveness. In 2016, Roku partnered with Magna, a media firm that specializes in advertising, in order to incorporate targeted advertising on its streaming platform.

=== 2017–2018: Initial public offering ===
On September 28, 2017, Roku held an initial public offering of stock and began trading on the Nasdaq exchange. Vox reported in the same year that the company was transitioning into "taking a cut of advertising and subscription fees" generated by "video programmers" using Roku's devices, while also stating that Netflix and YouTube didn't give Roku such a cut. Roku stated in September 2017 that it received a "revenue share" whenever it signed up a new customer for subscription content including Netflix. In 2017 Roku also launched its self-serving advertising product to allow advertisers to serve ads to Roku's users. These include video ads, interactive video ads, audience development promotions and brand sponsorships. This was made possible through Roku allowing advertisers to transition from standard cable TV advertising to Roku's streaming platform. In the same year, Roku was also reported as expanding its international reach by launching its streaming players in Argentina, Chile, Colombia, Costa Rica, El Salvador, Guatemala, Honduras, Nicaragua, Panama and Peru.

=== 2019–2022: Growth ===
In July 2019, Roku started moving to a new headquarters in San Jose, with plans to vacate offices subleased from Netflix. In the same month, The Verge cited a "Strategy Analytics" report which showed that Roku was the most popular streaming platform in the United States in 2019, with over 30% share. In November 2019, Roku announced its acquisition of dataxu video advertising platform, for $150 million in cash and stocks. Roku shares rose more than two percent subsequent to the announcement. By January 2020, Roku had launched in Brazil and had a limited footprint in Ireland, according to Variety.

On January 8, 2021, Roku announced it would acquire rights to Quibi's content, for an amount less than $100 million, and that all of Quibi's 75 programs would be available on its free, ad-supported streaming service, The Roku Channel. On March 19, 2021, TZP Growth Partners completed the sale of This Old House Ventures to Roku. All 1,500 episodes of Ask This Old House and This Old House will be made available to owners of Roku streaming products free with ads and through their dedicated 24/7 Streaming TV channel. PBS will still have rights to air episodes on their platforms. In June 2021, CNBC cited Parks Associates data, which indicated that Roku had consistently been the leader among all streaming platforms in the U.S., with Amazon catching up. In August 2021, Roku's streaming players were reported to be available in India. In September 2021, Reuters reported Roku as launching its products in Germany. In October 2021, Mashable cited Roku as the most popular brand in the streaming devices market.

In January 2022, Los Angeles Times called Roku's software the "most popular television operating system in the U.S.", while reporting on Roku's focus on growing its own streaming channel. In April 2022, Roku was said to be launching a new ad program to allow advertisers to serve "targeted ads in real time". In May 2022, CNBC stated that research firm Conviva found Roku to be the market leader in U.S. TV streaming devices, while also reporting a new joint venture between Comcast and Charter. According to Digiday in September 2022, a market study by "Pixalate" found Roku devices to be the "No. 1" in the connected TV advertising market, with a 44% share of ad spend. In the same month, "Walmart Connect", Walmart's retail media platform, partnered with Roku to offer closed-loop measurement of the ads displayed on the Roku platform. In November 2022, Digiday referenced another study indicating that Roku held a market-leading 38.99% share of connected TV ad impressions, while also experiencing a slowdown in its advertising revenue.

According to Variety in January 2023, Roku claimed to have more than 70 million customer accounts globally. Another Variety article in the same month cited "TVision data" showing the Roku OS as leading the U.S. smart TV sector with a 36% share. January 2023 also saw Roku's launch of its own smart TVs.

=== 2023–present: Advertising focus and purchase by Fox Corporation ===
In April 2023, online publisher The Drum reported that Roku was partnering with grocery delivery service Instacart to build tools to measure the effectiveness of brand advertising on the Roku platform. In particular, the partnership involved "linking" of Roku's proprietary viewership data to Instacart's sales data, and thereby informing brand advertisers when their streaming ads on Roku yield purchases on Instacart. That same month, Roku was reported to have topped the "CTV open programmatic ad traffic in North America" with nearly 50% market share, after falling by 4% over the preceding year. The company was also reported to have formed advertising partnerships with Best Buy, Cox Automotive, DoorDash, Kroger, Shopify, Spotify and Walmart. Additionally, Roku had partnered with Adobe, Analytic Partners, Ipsos MMA, IRI, Microsoft and Nielsen to gather insights towards measuring ad effectiveness in the broader internet environment.

In September 2023, a market study by Beachfront Marketing found that Roku had the largest share, nearly 40%, of connected TV ad impressions in the first half of the year. Later, in November 2023, Roku announced a partnership with app monetization platform Unity to assist performance-based advertising on the Roku platform.

In April 2024, Roku announced new partnerships with iSpot for ad measurement and The Trade Desk for ad targeting. Roku was also in an ad targeting partnership with Target by this time. That same month, CNN and The Verge reported that 576,000 Roku accounts were compromised in a cyberattack based on credential stuffing. This followed a previous security breach for the company earlier in the year affecting 15,000 accounts. According to Roku, hackers were able to make purchases on the Roku platform in fewer than 400 cases, and were not able to gain access to sensitive financial information. The company said that it was reversing charges and refunding all affected accounts. It also announced rolling out two-factor authentication across all Roku accounts to prevent such incidents in future.

In September 2024, Roku launched "Roku Ads Manager", a self-serve ad platform, claiming that the platform was a way for advertisers to buy and optimize advertisements. The company said it expected the platform to attract performance-oriented advertisers and offer ad targeting across all the streaming inventory available on Roku, including that coming from streaming services such as Netflix, Prime Video, Max and Peacock. That same month, Mustafa Ozgen, Roku's "president of devices", stated that Roku remained committed to producing its namesake streaming players even as TV units were outselling streaming players. He also noted that the company’s "content business", which included advertising sales and revenue sharing from streaming services, generated more revenue than hardware sales.

In October 2024, Roku was identified as the leading connected TV (CTV) device both in the U.S. and globally. During the July-September 2024 period, Roku accounted for 37% of all open programmatic ads delivered in the U.S. as well as globally, a decrease from its 52% share during the same period in 2023. This decline was attributed to the expansion of the CTV market and increased competition from other CTV platforms, which had "opened up and attracted users". In November 2024, The Roku Channel held the highest share among all free-ad supported streaming services in the U.S., including Fox's Tubi (1.8%) and Paramount's Pluto TV (0.9%).

For the year 2024, Roku reported $4.1 billion in revenue, $129.3 million in net loss and $218.2 million in operating loss. It also said it had $2.49 billion in total stockholders’ equity, $4.3 billion in total assets and an employee count of 3,340 by the year end. In addition, the company noted that it had reached over 90 million streaming households in January 2025 and that The Roku Channel reached households with nearly 145 million people.

In January 2025, Roku announced the launch of the Roku Data Cloud, a service that provided marketers with detailed streaming TV data. This data was offered through third-party analytics services such as Omnicom and PMG, as well as ad measurement companies Innovid and iSpot. Roku also stated that an integration with Yahoo DSP was planned for the second half of 2025. At the time of the announcement, the company noted that although streaming TV outperformed linear TV, it still faced attribution challenges due to the absence of "clicks" on TV. In the first quarter of 2025, according to Pixalate, 38% of connected-TV programmatic ads were delivered to Roku viewers (the highest percentage of any platform), followed by Amazon’s Fire TV with 18%.

On May 1, 2025, Roku announced that it would acquire Frndly TV for $185 million. In September 2025, the company cited Nielsen data showing that U.S. viewers were spending more time streaming content on Roku-powered devices than watching traditional broadcast television. In July 2025 in particular, Roku-powered devices accounted for 21.4% of all TV viewing time in the U.S. , surpassing broadcast TV’s 18.4% share, following similar trends from May and June 2025.

Roku launched Howdy, an ad-free subscription streaming service priced at US$2.99 per month, in August 2025. The service offered nearly 10,000 hours of licensed films and television programs from partners including Lionsgate, Warner Bros. Discovery, and FilmRise, alongside selected Roku Original titles.

Roku expanded Howdy's distribution beyond its own platform in March 2026 by making the service available through Amazon's Prime Video and launching standalone mobile applications for iOS and Android in the United States.

In April 2026, Roku announced that it reached 100 million households through connected devices and smart TVs. Through licensing deals with a number of OEMs, Roku’s interface was stated to be used in nearly one-third of TVs in North America and in nearly half of U.S. broadband households.

Roku introduced Roku Curate in April 2026, an advertising solution that combined its proprietary audience data and connected television advertising inventory with purchase-based data from partners including Best Buy Ads, Criteo, Fandango, Fetch, Instacart, and Kroger. The offering allowed advertisers to create targeted advertising packages and use partner data to measure campaign performance and consumer purchases.

On June 15, 2026, Fox Corporation announced its intent to purchase Roku in a cash-and-stock deal valued at around $22 billion. Fox intends to pair Roku's sports and news programming with a top ‌TV streaming platform to strengthen its position as audiences shift online. The acquisition was closed on November 6, 2026. Upon closing, existing Fox shareholders own about 73% of the combined company and Roku shareholders about 27%.

== Legacy products ==
Roku's consumer products included:

- PhotoBridge HD1000, a system for displaying images on a high-definition television, as well as streaming MPEG video. The unit has four card readers on the front and can read from a CompactFlash Card type II, Memory Stick, MultiMediaCard, SD Memory Card, or SmartMedia Card
- Roku SoundBridge, a network music player
- SoundBridge Radio, a network music player with built-in speakers and subwoofer, AM‑FM receiver, volume-ramping alarm clock, preset buttons, SD slot, and headphone jack

For retailers, Roku also produced:

- BrightSign solid-state media player, designed to drive HD displays in a retail environment.

Roku's audio products did not use internal storage but relied on Wi-Fi or Ethernet to stream digital audio over a network, either from Internet radio or a computer attached to the same network. Roku introduced the Radio Roku Internet radio directory in August 2007; Radio Roku provides a directory of Internet stations, accessible from a web browser or from SoundBridge players.

== Roku streaming players ==
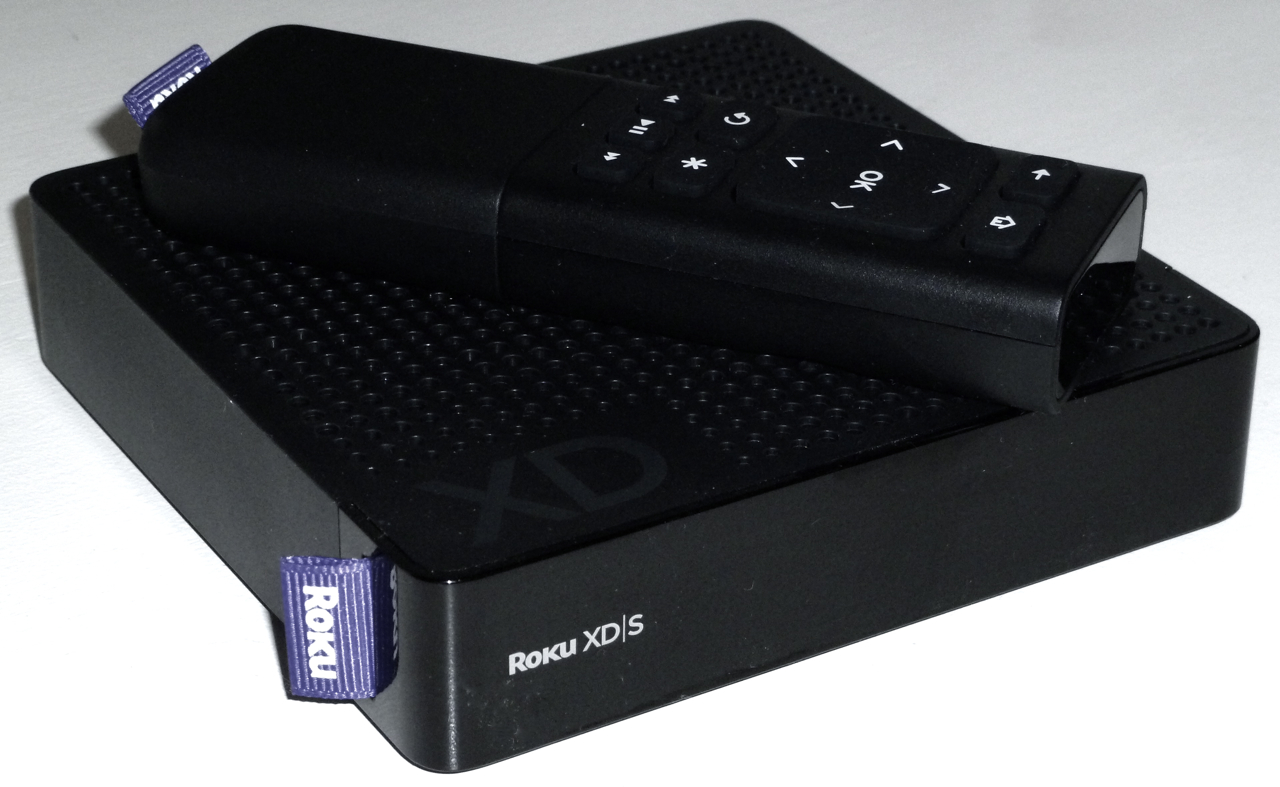
The XD/S has HDMI and component output for high-definition video on new and older televisions.

Roku produces set-top boxes for delivery of over-the-top content. Content is provided by Roku partners, identified using the "channel" vernacular. Each separate channel supports content from one partner, although some content partners have more than one channel. In May 2011, Roku stated the Streaming Players had over one million viewers and had delivered 15 million channel downloads.

Roku devices support both on-demand content and live streaming. For live TV streams, Roku supports Apple HLS (HTTP Live Streaming) adaptive streaming technology. Both free and paid "channels" are available, as are some games. Roku Streaming Players are open-platform devices with a freely available SDK that enables anyone to create new channels. The channels are written in a Roku-specific language called BrightScript, a scripting language the company calls "similar to Visual Basic".

== Roku TVs, Roku OS ==
Roku's uses its proprietary operating system, the Roku OS, as its software for streaming. It licenses its streaming technology and the Roku OS to set-top box providers such as Sky and Telstra, and 35 TV brands such as Aiwa, Daewoo, Element Electronics, Hisense, InFocus, JVC, Magnavox, Philips, RCA, Sansui, Sanyo, Sharp, TCL, Walmart's Onn, and Westinghouse. Roku's platform also includes the Roku Channel Store, which distributes over 5,000 streaming services — including Netflix — and offers more than 500 of them for free.

Roku announced its first branded smart TV in early 2014 and it was released in late 2014. These TVs are manufactured by companies other than Roku, and use the Roku user interface as the "brain" of the TV. Roku TVs are updated in the same way as Roku's streaming devices, though on a slightly modified schedule due to the extra features and picture/audio adjustment options the Roku TV menu interface must support. Several manufacturers offer added features for over-the-air reception for added cord-cutter value, including extended electronic program guides which provide more information than regularly sent by the PSIP protocol, and over-the-air program search integrated into the Roku search system. Also offered are program buffers and pausing with the use of a 16GB+ USB flash drive.

Roku introduced its own line of televisions in 2023, and sold one million units in 2024.

Roku began rolling out a redesigned Home Screen in May 2026, its first major redesign in more than a decade. The update introduced personalized content recommendations, a Quick Access section for frequently used applications, and new content-navigation features. It also made advertising more prominent on the main screen, with a large advertisement remaining visible as users navigated the interface.

Roku introduced Roku Labs in September 2026, a hub through which users in the United States could access experimental applications developed by the company. Initial offerings included applications for tracking weather and stock prices, allowing users to test features that were still under development.

== Roku Channel ==
Roku launched its own free, ad-supported streaming channel called The Roku Channel on its devices in 2017. At launch it included licensed content from studios such as Lionsgate, Metro-Goldwyn-Mayer, Paramount Pictures, Sony Pictures Entertainment, Warner Bros., Disney, and Universal Pictures, as well as from The Roku Channel content publishers American Classics, FilmRise, Nosey, OVGuide, Popcornflix, Vidmark, and YuYu. It implemented an ad revenue sharing model with content providers. On August 8, 2018, The Roku Channel became available on web as well. Roku also added the "Featured Free" section as the top section of its main menu from where users can get access to direct streaming of shows and movies from its partners. On April 7, 2020, The Roku Channel launched in the UK, with a different selection of movies and TV shows. The Roku Channel is also available on other smart TV platforms such as Fire TV, Apple TV with AirPlay, Google TV, and Samsung TV.

The Roku Channel was the most watched U.S. FAST service in November 2024, as per Nielsen's TV viewership data. Roku said the channel reached households with nearly 145 million people by the end of 2024. The Roku Channel gathered 2.5% of all U.S. TV use in May 2025 as per Nielsen's data, and ranked as the fifth most-watched streaming service, trailing YouTube (12.5%), Netflix (7.5%), Disney-owned services (5%) and Amazon Prime Video (3.5%). According to Roku in May 2025, the streaming hours on The Roku Channel had increased by 84% year over year and the channel was the second most-engaged service on the Roku platform among U.S. viewers.

In April 2026, The CW and Roku announced a partnership under which scripted and unscripted CW programs, including Scrabble, Trivial Pursuit, Sherlock & Daughter, and Private Eyes West Coast, would become available for next-day streaming on The Roku Channel beginning in fall 2026. New installments of WWE NXT were also included in the agreement, which provided for a CW-branded hub featuring more than 800 hours of library programming.

Roku added Fox One as a premium subscription on The Roku Channel in the United States in May 2026, allowing subscribers to access its live and on-demand news, sports, and entertainment programming through their Roku accounts.

== Roku Speakers, Roku Smart Home ==
In January 2018, Roku launched a licensing program allowing other manufacturers to use its soundbar and speaker designs, as well as the Roku operating system. According to Variety in September 2019, Roku was introducing soundbar and subwoofer products to "marry TV streaming with smart sound". In January 2023, CNN reported that Roku was introducing its "Roku Smart Home" line that included light strips, bulbs, security cameras and a video doorbell. In May 2023, it was reported that home monitoring devices that could be accessed using a Roku device were added to Roku's Smart Home line.
