= Replay TV =

Replay TV may refer to

- ReplayTV, a digital video recorder
- Catch up TV, a type of Internet TV
