= Roku =

Brand of streaming media players

- Product type: Categories: Streaming player; Smart TV; TV operating system; Free TV streaming service; Soundbars; Smart home device
- Current owner: Roku, Inc.
- Country: List of countries: U.S.; Argentina; Australia; Brazil; Canada; Chile; Colombia; France; Germany; Mexico; Peru; U.K.
- Introduced: May 20, 2008; 18 years ago
- Related brands: The Roku Channel; Roku OS; Roku City; Howdy; Frndly TV
- Markets: Streaming hardware; Streaming TV distribution; Streaming TV advertising; Smart home
- Tagline: Happy Streaming
- Website: www.roku.com

Roku (/ˈroʊkuː/ ROH-koo) is a brand of consumer electronics that includes digital media players, smart TVs (and their operating systems), as well as two streaming services (The Roku Channel and Howdy). The brand is owned by Roku, Inc., which is owned by Fox Corporation.

As of 2024, Roku was the U.S. market leader in streaming video distribution, reaching nearly 145 million people.

== History ==
Roku was founded by Anthony Wood in 2002; he had previously founded ReplayTV, a DVR company that competed with TiVo. After ReplayTV's failure, Wood worked for a while at Netflix. In 2007, Wood's company began working with Netflix on Project:Griffin, a set-top box to allow Netflix users to stream Netflix content to their TVs. Only a few weeks before the project's launch, Netflix's founder Reed Hastings decided it would hamper license arrangements with third parties, potentially keeping Netflix off other similar platforms, and killed the project. Fast Company magazine cited the decision to kill the project as "one of Netflix's riskiest moves".

Netflix then decided instead to spin off the company, and Roku released their first set-top box in 2008. In 2010 they began offering models with various capabilities, which eventually became their standard business model. In 2014, Roku partnered with smart TV manufacturers to produce TVs with built-in Roku functionality. In 2015, Roku won the inaugural Emmy for Television Enhancement Devices.

In January 2018, CNET reported that Roku was debuting a new licensing program for smart audio devices such as smart speakers, sound bars and whole-home audio, while noting the "ease of use" and "superb streaming options" offered by Roku TVs.

According to CNBC in 2021, Roku was the U.S. market leader in streaming video distribution. Later in 2023, Variety called Roku "the top connected TV platform" in the U.S. In December 2023, a Popular Mechanics review cited Roku TVs to be affordable and easy to use, while also noting that the Roku-integrated TVs lacked "the premium brand badging of big players like Sony or Samsung".

According to The Verge in July 2024, a Roku OS update in June 2024 had "ruined" the Roku TV experience. This update added "motion smoothing", and was reportedly irreversible. This followed another identical issue reported in 2020 for Roku TVs made by TCL.

In August 2024, a Wired review noted that ease of use was one of the main reasons to buy any Roku product.

In February 2025, Roku said it reached more than 90 million streaming households. The Roku Channel reportedly reached households with nearly 145 million people.

On June 15, 2026, it was announced that Fox Corporation had agreed to acquire Roku, Inc. for $22 billion. The combined company would become the third-largest player in U.S. television by share of viewing.

On July 17, 2026, it was announced that Elizabeth Warren and other congressional Democrats are warning of antitrust implications in Fox Corp.'s proposed acquisition of Roku. In a letter addressed to the Associate Attorney General Stanley Woodward, it was stated that "Eliminating a significant competitor would reduce consumer choice for free streaming services and could give the combined entity market power to start charging for a previously free service." Also, the "merger between Fox and Roku may also give the combined Fox-Roku entity the incentive to preference and steer viewers to Fox content for the 100 million Roku households, disadvantaging Fox competitors and limiting consumer choice."

== Roku streaming players ==
=== First generation ===
The first Roku model, the Roku DVP N1000, was unveiled on May 20, 2008. It was developed in partnership with Netflix to serve as a standalone set-top box for its recently introduced "Watch Instantly" service. The goal was to produce a device with a small footprint that could be sold at low cost compared to larger digital video recorders and video game consoles. It features an NXP PNX8935 video decoder supporting both standard and high definition formats up to 720p; HDMI output; and automatic software updates, including the addition of new channels for other video services.

Roku launched two new models in October 2009: the Roku SD (a simplified version of the DVP, with only analog AV outputs); and the Roku HD-XR, an updated version with 802.11n Wi-Fi and a USB port for future functionality. The Roku DVP was retroactively renamed the Roku HD. By then, Roku had added support for other services. The next month, they introduced the Channel Store, where users could download third-party apps for other content services (including the possibility of private services for specific uses).

Netflix support was initially dependent on a PC, requiring users to add content to their "Instant Queue" from the service's web interface before it could be accessed via Roku. In May 2010, the channel was updated to allow users to search the Netflix library directly from the device.

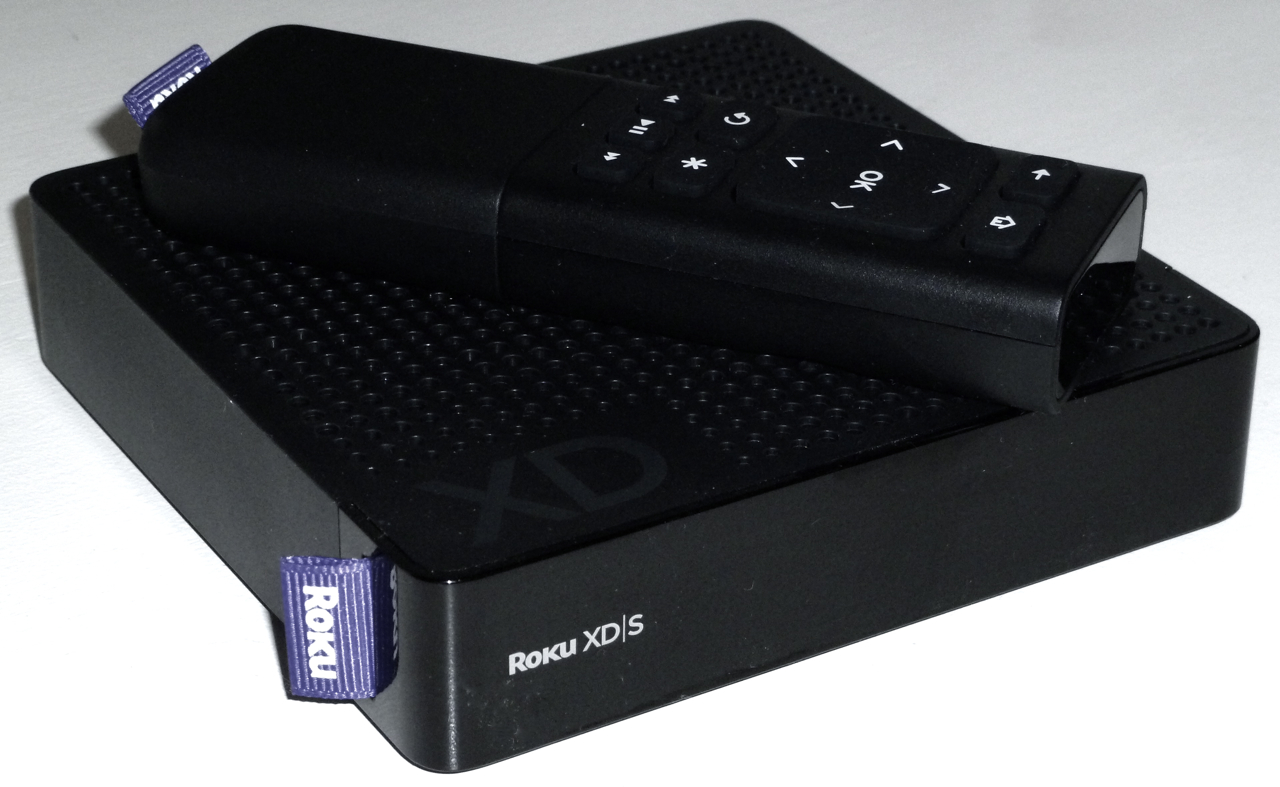
Original form factor XD/S

In August 2010, Roku announced plans to add 1080p video support to the HD-XR. The next month, they released an updated lineup with thinner form factors: a new HD; the XD, with 1080p support; and the XDS, with optical audio, dual-band Wi-Fi, and a USB port. The XD and XDS also included an updated remote.

Support for the first-generation Roku models ended in September 2015.

=== Second generation ===
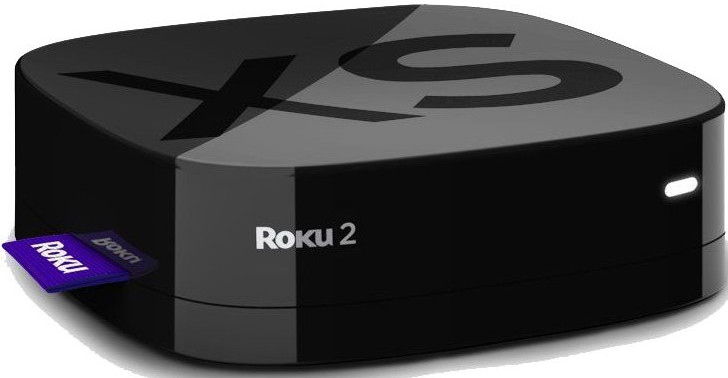
A Roku 2 XS

In July 2011, Roku unveiled its second generation of players, branded as Roku 2 HD, XD, and XS. All three models include 802.11n, and also add microSD slots and Bluetooth. The XD and XS support 1080p, and only the XS model includes an Ethernet connector and USB port. They also support the "Roku Game Remote"—a Bluetooth remote with motion controller support for games, which was bundled with the XS and sold separately for other models. The Roku LT was unveiled in October, as an entry-level model with no Bluetooth or microSD support.

In January 2012, Roku unveiled the Streaming Stick - a new model condensed into a dongle form factor using Mobile High-Definition Link (MHL). Later in October, Roku introduced a new search feature to the second-generation models, aggregating content from services usable on the device.

=== Third generation ===
Roku unveiled its third-generation models in March 2013, the Roku 3 and Roku 2. The Roku 3 contains an upgraded CPU over the 2 XS, and a Wi-Fi Direct remote with an integrated headphone jack. The Roku 2 features only the faster CPU. A software update in October 2014 added support for peer-to-peer Miracast wireless.

=== Fourth generation ===
In October 2015, Roku introduced the Roku 4; the device contains upgraded hardware with support for 4K resolution video, as well as 802.11ac wireless.

=== Fifth generation ===
In September 2016, Roku revamped their entire streaming player line-up with five new models (low end Roku Express, Roku Express+, high end Roku Premiere, Roku Premiere+, and top-of-the-line Roku Ultra), while the Streaming Stick (3600) was held over from the previous generation (having been released the previous April) as a sixth option. The Roku Premiere+ and Roku Ultra support HDR video using HDR10.

=== Sixth generation ===
In October 2017, Roku introduced its sixth generation of products. The Premiere and Premiere+ models were discontinued, the Streaming Stick+ (with an enhanced Wi-Fi antenna device) was introduced, as well as new processors for the Roku Streaming Stick, Roku Express, and Roku Express+.

=== Seventh generation ===
In September 2018, Roku introduced the seventh generation of products. Carrying over from the 2017 sixth-generation without any changes were the Express (3900), Express+ (3910), Streaming Stick (3800), and Streaming Stick+ (3810). The Ultra is the same hardware device from 2017, but it comes with JBL premium headphones and is repackaged with the new model number 4661. Roku has resurrected the Premiere and Premiere+ names, but these two new models bear little resemblance to the 2016 fifth-generation Premiere (4620) and Premiere+ (4630) models. The new Premiere (3920) and Premiere+ (3921) are essentially based on the Express (3900) model with 4K support added, it also includes Roku Streaming Stick+ Headphone Edition (3811) for improving Wifi signal strength and private listening.

=== Eighth generation ===
In September 2019, Roku introduced the eighth generation of products.

The same year, Netflix announced that it would stop supporting older generations of Roku, including the Roku HD, HD-XR, SD, XD, and XDS, as well as the NetGear-branded XD and XDS beginning on December 1, 2019. Roku had warned in 2015 that it would stop updating players made in May 2011 or earlier, and these vintage boxes were among them.

=== Ninth generation ===
On September 28, 2020, Roku introduced the ninth generation of products. An updated Roku Ultra was released along with the addition of the Roku Streambar, a 2-in-1 Roku and Soundbar device. The microSD slot was removed from the new Ultra 4800, making it the first top-tier Roku device since the first generation to lack this feature. On April 14, 2021, Roku announced the Roku Express 4K+, replacing the 8th generation Roku Express devices, the Voice Remote Pro as an optional upgrade for existing Roku players, and Roku OS 10 for all modern Roku devices.

=== Tenth generation ===
On September 20, 2021, Roku introduced the tenth generation of products. The Roku Streaming Stick 4K was announced along with the Roku Streaming Stick 4K+ which includes an upgraded rechargeable Roku Voice Remote Pro with lost remote finder. Roku announced an updated Roku Ultra LT with a faster processor, stronger Wi-Fi and Dolby Vision as well as Bluetooth audio streaming and built-in Ethernet support. Roku also announced Roku OS 10.5 with several new and improved features.

On November 15, 2021, Roku announced a budget model Roku LE (3930S3) to be sold at Walmart, while supplies last. It lacks 4K and HDR10 support, making its features similar to those of the 2019 Roku Express (3930). It has the same form factor as the 2019 Roku Express, except the plastic shell is white rather than black.

=== Eleventh generation ===
On April 23, 2025, Roku introduced the eleventh generation of products. Two new streaming players, Roku Streaming Stick and Roku Streaming Stick Plus were added to the lineup, along with hardware innovations to Roku TV and a reference design for a Roku TV Smart Projector. The new streaming sticks are more power efficient than their predecessors and can be powered by a TV USB port.

This generation of Streaming Sticks have replaced the MicroUSB ports with USB-C ports and have dropped both Dolby Vision HDR and the long range Wi-Fi connectivity.

=== Feature comparison ===
First generation
Model	Introduced	Video outputs		Video resolutions			Audio output		Network		USB	Remote	Processor	Memory	Channel storage (Note: In the first generation players, the size of flash memory limited the number of channels that could be installed. Later models (>2100) removed that limit.)	micro SD slot	Netflix with Profiles
Model	Introduced	Composite, S-Video	Component, HDMI	480i, 480p	720p, 1080p (HD)	2160p (4K)	Analog	Optical, HDMI	Ethernet	802.11 wireless	USB	Remote	Processor	Memory	Channel storage	micro SD slot	Netflix with Profiles
Roku DVP (N1000)	May 2008	Both	Both	Both	720p	No	Yes	Both	Yes	b/g	No	IR	PNX8935 400 MHz	256 MB	64 MB	No	No
Roku SD (N1050)	Oct 2009	Composite	Neither	480i	Neither	No	Yes	Neither	Yes	b/g	No	IR	PNX8935 400 MHz	256 MB	64 MB	No	No
Roku HD (N1100)	Nov 2009	Both	Both	Both	720p	No	Yes	Both	Yes	b/g	No	IR	PNX8935 400 MHz	256 MB	64 MB	No	No
Roku HD-XR (N1101)	Oct 2009	Both	Both	Both	Both (Note: 1080p at p24 or p30 only.)	No	Yes	Both	Yes	a/b/g/n dual-band	Yes	IR	PNX8935 400 MHz	256 MB	256 MB	No	No
Roku HD (2000)	Sep 2010	Composite	HDMI	Both	720p	No	Yes	HDMI	Yes	b/g	No	IR	PNX8935 400 MHz	256 MB	64 MB	No	No
Roku XD (2050)	Sep 2010	Composite	HDMI	Both	Both	No	Yes	HDMI	Yes	b/g/n	No	IR	PNX8935 400 MHz	256 MB	64 MB	No	No
Roku XDS (2100)	Sep 2010	Composite	Both (Note: The component video connector on the Roku XDS (2100X) is a nonstandard 3.5mm connector and a proprietary adapter cable, which is sold separately, is effectively required to use this.)	Both	Both	No	Yes	Both	Yes	a/b/g/n dual-band	Yes	IR	PNX8935 400 MHz	256 MB	256 MB	No	No

Second generation
Model	Introduced	Video outputs		Video resolutions			Audio output		Network		USB	Remote	Processor	Memory	Channel storage	micro SD slot	Netflix with Profiles
Model	Introduced	Composite, S-Video	Component, HDMI	480i, 480p	720p, 1080p (HD)	2160p (4K)	Analog	Optical, HDMI	Ethernet	802.11 wireless	USB	Remote	Processor	Memory	Channel storage	micro SD slot	Netflix with Profiles
Roku LT (2400)	Nov 2011	Composite	HDMI	Both	720p	No	Yes	HDMI	No	b/g/n	No	IR	BCM2835 600 MHz	256 MB	256 MB	No	No
Roku LT (2450)	Apr 2012	Composite	HDMI	Both	720p	No	Yes	HDMI	No	b/g/n	No	IR	BCM7208 405 MHz	256 MB	256 MB	No	No
Roku HD (2500)	Apr 2012	Composite	HDMI	Both	720p	No	Yes	HDMI	No	b/g/n	No	IR	BCM7208 405 MHz	256 MB	256 MB	No	No
Roku 2 HD (3000)	Jul 2011	Composite	HDMI	Both	720p	No	Yes	HDMI	No	b/g/n	No	IR (Note: Bluetooth remote optional.)	BCM2835 600 MHz	256 MB	256 MB	Yes	No
Roku 2 XD (3050)	Jul 2011	Composite	HDMI	Both	Both (Note: 1080p at p60 only.)	No	Yes	HDMI	No	b/g/n	No	IR	BCM2835 600 MHz	256 MB	256 MB	Yes	No
Roku 2 XS (3100)	Jul 2011	Composite	HDMI	Both	Both	No	Yes	HDMI	Yes	b/g/n	No	IR, Bluetooth	BCM2835 600 MHz	256 MB	256 MB	Yes	No
Roku Streaming Stick, MHL (3400, 3420)	Oct 2012	Neither	MHL only	480p	Both (Note: 1080p at p24.)	No	No	HDMI	No	b/g/n dual-band	Mini 2.0: Power	Wi-Fi Direct	BCM2835 600 MHz	256 MB	512 MB	No	No
Roku Streaming Stick, HDMI (3500)	Mar 2014	Neither	HDMI	Neither	720p	No	No	HDMI	No	a/b/g/n dual-band	Mini 2.0: Power	Wi-Fi Direct	BCM2835 600 MHz	512 MB	256 MB	No	Yes

Third generation
Model	Introduced	Video outputs		Video resolutions			Audio output		Network		USB	Remote	Processor	Memory	Channel storage	micro SD slot	Netflix with Profiles
Model	Introduced	Composite, S-Video	Component, HDMI	480i, 480p	720p, 1080p (HD)	2160p (4K)	Analog	Optical, HDMI	Ethernet	802.11 wireless	USB	Remote	Processor	Memory	Channel storage	micro SD slot	Netflix with Profiles
Roku LT (2700)	Sep 2013	Composite	HDMI	Both	720p	No	Yes	HDMI	No	b/g/n	No	IR	BCM7218 600 MHz	512 MB	256 MB	No	No
Roku 1, SE (2710)	Sep 2013	Composite	HDMI	Both	Both	No	Yes	HDMI	No	b/g/n	No	IR	BCM7218 600 MHz	512 MB	256 MB	No	No
Roku 2 (2720)	Sep 2013	Composite	HDMI	Both	Both	No	Yes & Remote	HDMI	No	a/b/g/n dual-band	No	IR, Wi-Fi Direct	BCM7218 600 MHz	512 MB	256 MB	No	No
Roku 3 (4200)	Mar 2013	Neither	HDMI	Neither	Both	No	Remote (Note: Analog audio output is available only through the headphone jack on the remote.)	HDMI	Yes	a/b/g/n dual-band	USB-A 2.0: Mass Storage	IR, Wi-Fi Direct	BCM11130 900 MHz	512 MB	256 MB	Yes	Yes
Roku 2 (4210)	Apr 2015	Neither	HDMI	Neither	Both	No	No	HDMI	Yes	a/b/g/n dual-band	USB-A 2.0 Mass Storage	IR (Note: WiFi Direct Remote optional.)	BCM11130 900 MHz	512 MB	256 MB	Yes	Yes
Roku 3 (4230)	Apr 2015	Neither	HDMI	Neither	Both	No	Remote	HDMI	Yes	a/b/g/n dual-band	USB-A 2.0 Mass Storage	IR, Wi-Fi Direct, Voice Search	BCM11130 900 MHz	512 MB	256 MB	Yes	Yes

Fourth generation
Model	Introduced	Video outputs		Video resolutions			Audio output		Network		USB	Remote	Processor	Memory	Channel storage	micro SD slot	Netflix with Profiles
Model	Introduced	Composite, S-Video	Component, HDMI	480i, 480p	720p, 1080p (HD)	2160p (4K)	Analog	Optical, HDMI	Ethernet	802.11 wireless	USB	Remote	Processor	Memory	Channel storage	micro SD slot	Netflix with Profiles
Roku Streaming Stick (3600)	Apr 2016	Neither	HDMI	Neither	Both	No	Stream to smartphone	HDMI	No	a/b/g/n dual-band	Mini 2.0: Power	Wi-Fi Direct	BCM2836 900 MHz	512 MB	256 MB	No	Yes
Roku 4 (4400)	Oct 2015	Neither	HDMI	Neither	Both	Yes	Remote	Optical & HDMI	10/100 Mbps	a/b/g/n/ac dual-band	USB-A 2.0: Mass Storage	IR, Wi-Fi Direct, Voice Search	STV7723A01	1.5 GB	512 MB	Yes	Yes

Fifth generation
Model	Introduced	Video outputs		Video resolutions			HDR format	Audio output		Network		USB	Remote	Processor	Memory	Channel storage	micro SD slot	Netflix with Profiles
Model	Introduced	Composite, S-Video	Component, HDMI	480i, 480p	720p60, 1080p60 (HD)	2160p60 (4K)	Dolby Vision/HDR10+/ HDR10/HLG	Analog	Optical, HDMI	Ethernet	802.11 wireless	USB	Remote	Processor	Memory	Channel storage	micro SD slot	Netflix with Profiles
Roku Express (3700)	Oct 2016	Neither	HDMI	Neither	Both	No	No	Stream to smartphone	HDMI	No	b/g/n	Micro 2.0: Power	IR	MStar C2 (MSA3Z177Z1 900 Mhz)	512 MB	256 MB	No	Yes
Roku Express+ (3710)	Oct 2016	Composite	HDMI	480i	Both	No	No	Yes & Stream to smartphone	HDMI	No	b/g/n	Micro 2.0: Power	IR	MStar C2 (MSA3Z177Z1 900 MHz)	512 MB	256 MB	No	Yes
Roku Premiere (4620)	Oct 2016	Neither	HDMI	Neither	Both	Yes	HDR10, HLG	Stream to smartphone	HDMI	No	a/b/g/n/ac dual-band	No	IR	MStar C2 (MSO9380 1.2GHz)	1 GB	512 MB	No	Yes
Roku Premiere+ (4630)	Oct 2016	Neither	HDMI	Neither	Both	Yes	HDR10, HLG	Remote & Stream to smartphone	HDMI	10/100 Mbps	a/b/g/n/ac dual-band	No	IR, Wi-Fi Direct	MStar C2 (MSO9380 1.2GHz)	1 GB	512 MB	Yes	Yes
Roku Ultra (4640)	Oct 2016	Neither	HDMI	Neither	Both	Yes	HDR10, HLG	Remote & Stream to smartphone	Optical & HDMI	10/100 Mbps	a/b/g/n/ac dual-band	USB-A 2.0: Mass Storage	IR, Wi-Fi Direct, Voice Search	MStar C2 (MSO9380 1.2GHz)	1 GB	1 GB	Yes	Yes

Sixth generation
Model	Introduced	Video outputs		Video resolutions			HDR format	Audio output		Network		USB	Remote	Processor	Memory	Channel storage	micro SD slot	Netflix with Profiles
Model	Introduced	Composite, S-Video	Component, HDMI	480i, 480p	720p60, 1080p60 (HD)	2160p60 (4K)	Dolby Vision/HDR10+/ HDR10/HLG	Analog	Optical, HDMI	Ethernet	802.11 wireless	USB	Remote	Processor	Memory	Channel storage	micro SD slot	Netflix with Profiles
Roku Express (3900)	Oct 2017	Neither	HDMI	Neither	Both	No	No	Stream to smartphone	HDMI	No	b/g/n	Micro 2.0: Power	IR	MStar C2	512MB	256MB	No	Yes
Roku Express+ (3910)	Oct 2017	Composite	HDMI	480i	Both	No	No	Yes & Stream to smartphone	HDMI	No	b/g/n	Micro 2.0: Power	IR	MStar C2	512MB	256MB	No	Yes
Roku Streaming Stick (3800)	Oct 2017	Neither	HDMI	Neither	Both	No	No	Stream to smartphone	HDMI	No	a/b/g/n/ac dual-band	Mini 2.0: Power	Wi-Fi Direct, Voice Search	MStar C2	512MB	256MB	No	Yes
Roku Streaming Stick+ (3810)	Oct 2017	Neither	HDMI	Neither	Both	Yes	HDR10, HLG	Stream to smartphone	HDMI	No	a/b/g/n/ac dual-band	Mini 2.0: Power, Long Range Wireless Receiver	Wi-Fi Direct, Voice Search	MStar C2	1GB	512MB	No	Yes
Roku Ultra (4660)	Oct 2017	Neither	HDMI	Neither	Both	Yes	HDR10, HLG	Remote & Stream to smartphone	HDMI	10/100 Mbps	a/b/g/n/ac dual-band	USB-A 2.0: Mass Storage	IR, Wi-Fi Direct, Voice Search	MStar C2	1GB	512MB	Yes	Yes

Seventh generation
Model	Introduced	Ports				Video output			Audio output			Wireless 802.11	Remote	Processor	Memory	Storage
Model	Introduced	Optical, HDMI	Ethernet	USB	micro SD	HD	4K	Dolby Vision/HDR10+/ HDR10/HLG	Analog	DTS	Dolby Atmos	Wireless 802.11	Remote	Processor	Memory	Storage
Roku Premiere (3920)	Sep 2018	HDMI	No	Micro 2.0: Power	No	Yes	Yes	HDR10, HLG	Stream to smartphone	Yes	Yes	b/g/n	IR	MStar C2	1GB	512MB
Roku Premiere+ (3921)	Sep 2018	HDMI	No	Micro 2.0: Power	No	Yes	Yes	HDR10, HLG	Stream to smartphone	Yes	Yes	b/g/n	IR, Wi-Fi Direct, Voice Search	MStar C2	1GB	512MB
Roku Ultra (4661)	Sep 2018	HDMI	10/100 Mbps	USB-A 2.0: Mass Storage	Yes	Yes	Yes	HDR10, HLG	Remote & stream to smartphone	Yes	Yes	a/b/g/n/ac dual-band	IR, Wi-Fi Direct, Voice Search	MStar C2	1GB	512MB

Eighth generation
Model	Introduced	Ports				Video output			Audio output			Wireless 802.11	Remote	Processor	Memory	Storage
Model	Introduced	Optical, HDMI	Ethernet	USB	micro SD	HD	4K	Dolby Vision/HDR10+/ HDR10/HLG	Analog	DTS	Dolby Atmos	Wireless 802.11	Remote	Processor	Memory	Storage
Roku Streaming Stick+ (3810)	Sep 2019	HDMI 2.0a	No	Mini 2.0: Power, Long Range Wireless Receiver	No	Yes	Yes	HDR10, HLG	Stream to smartphone	Yes	Yes	a/b/g/n/ac dual-band	IR, Wi-Fi Direct, Voice Search	MStar C2	1GB	512MB
Roku Express, SE, LE (3930)	Sep 2019	HDMI 1.4b	No	Micro 2.0: Power	No	Yes	No	No	Stream to smartphone	Yes	Yes	b/g/n	IR	MStar C2	512MB	256MB
Roku Express+ (3931)	Sep 2019	HDMI 1.4b	No	Micro 2.0: Power	No	Yes	No	No	Stream to smartphone	Yes	Yes	b/g/n	IR, Wi-Fi Direct, Voice Search	MStar C2	512MB	256MB
Roku Premiere (3920)	Sep 2019	HDMI 2.0a	No	Micro 2.0: Power	No	Yes	Yes	HDR10, HLG	Stream to smartphone	Yes	Yes	b/g/n	IR	MStar C2	1GB	512MB
Roku Ultra LT (4662)	Sep 2019	HDMI 2.0a	10/100 Mbps	No	Yes	Yes	Yes	HDR10, HLG	Remote & Stream to smartphone	Yes	Yes	a/b/g/n/ac dual-band	IR, Wi-Fi Direct, Voice Search	MStar C2	1GB	512MB
Roku Ultra (4670)	Sep 2019	HDMI 2.0a	10/100 Mbps	USB-A 2.0: Mass Storage	Yes	Yes	Yes	HDR10, HLG	Remote & Stream to smartphone	Yes	Yes	a/b/g/n/ac dual-band	IR, Wi-Fi Direct, Voice Search	MStar C2	2GB	512MB

Ninth generation
Model	Introduced	Ports				Video output				Audio output			Wireless		Remote	Processor	Memory	Storage
Model	Introduced	Optical, HDMI	Ethernet	USB	micro SD	HD	4K	Dolby Vision/HDR10+/ HDR10/HLG	QMS/VRR	Analog	DTS	Dolby Atmos	802.11	Bluetooth	Remote	Processor	Memory	Storage
Roku Express 4K (3940)	May 2021	HDMI 2.0b	Requires compatible USB Ethernet adapter	Micro USB 2.0: Power, Ethernet, Mass Storage (requires OTG adapter)	No	Yes	Yes	HDR10+, HDR10, HLG	Yes	Stream to smartphone	Yes	Yes	a/b/g/n/ac dual-band	No	IR	Realtek 1315PR	1GB	4GB
Roku Express 4K+ (3941)	May 2021	HDMI 2.0b	Requires compatible USB Ethernet adapter	Micro USB 2.0: Power, Ethernet, Mass Storage (requires OTG adapter)	No	Yes	Yes	HDR10+, HDR10, HLG	Yes	Stream to smartphone	Yes	Yes	a/b/g/n/ac dual-band	No	Voice	Realtek 1315PR	1GB	4GB
Roku Ultra (4800)	Oct 2020	HDMI 2.0b	10/100 Mbps	USB-A 3.0: Mass Storage	No	Yes	Yes	All	Yes	Remote & Stream to smartphone	Yes	Decoder, AC4, MAT 2.0	a/b/g/n/ac dual-band MIMO	Yes	Voice, Headphone Jack, Lost Remote	Realtek 1319VR	2GB	4GB
Roku Streambar (9102)	Oct 2020	Optical, HDMI 2.0a (ARC)	Requires compatible USB Ethernet adapter	USB-A 2.0: Ethernet, Mass Storage	No	Yes	Yes	HDR10, HLG	No	Remote & Stream to smartphone	Yes	Yes	a/b/g/n/ac dual-band MIMO	Yes	Voice	MStar C2	1GB	512MB

Tenth generation
Model	Introduced	Ports				Video output				Audio output			Wireless		Remote	Processor	Memory	Storage
Model	Introduced	Optical, HDMI	Ethernet	USB	micro SD	HD	4K	Dolby Vision/HDR10+/ HDR10/HLG	QMS/VRR	Analog	DTS	Dolby Atmos	802.11	Bluetooth	Remote	Processor	Memory	Storage
Roku Streaming Stick 4K (3820)	Sep 2021	HDMI 2.0b	Requires compatible USB Ethernet adapter - no LRWR requires app remote	Micro USB 2.0: Power, Long Range Wireless Receiver, Ethernet, Mass Storage (requires OTG adapter)	No	Yes	Yes	All	Yes	Stream to smartphone	Yes	Yes	a/b/g/n/ac dual-band MIMO	No	Voice	Realtek 1315NR	1GB	4GB
Roku Streaming Stick 4K+ (3821)	Sep 2021	HDMI 2.0b	Requires compatible USB Ethernet adapter - no LRWR requires app remote	Micro USB 2.0: Power, Long Range Wireless Receiver, Ethernet, Mass Storage (requires OTG adapter)	No	Yes	Yes	All	Yes	Remote & Stream to smartphone	Yes	Yes	a/b/g/n/ac dual-band MIMO	No	Voice, Headphone Jack, Lost Remote, Rechargeable	Realtek 1315NR	1GB	4GB
Roku Ultra LT (4801)	Sep 2021	HDMI 2.0b	10/100 Mbps	No	No	Yes	Yes	All	Yes	Remote & Stream to smartphone	Yes	Yes	a/b/g/n/ac dual-band MIMO	Yes	Voice, Headphone Jack	Realtek 1319VR	2GB	4GB
Roku Ultra (4802)	May 2022	HDMI 2.0b	10/100 Mbps	USB-A 3.0: Mass Storage	No	Yes	Yes	All	Yes	Remote & Stream to smartphone	Yes	Decoder, AC4, MAT 2.0	a/b/g/n/ac dual-band MIMO	Yes	Voice, Headphone Jack, Lost Remote, Rechargeable	Realtek 1319VR	2GB	4GB
Roku Express (3960)	Sep 2022	HDMI 1.4b	Requires compatible USB Ethernet adapter	Micro USB 2.0: Power, Ethernet, Mass Storage (requires OTG adapter)	No	Yes	No	No	Yes	Stream to smartphone	Yes	Yes	a/b/g/n dual-band	No	IR	Realtek 1312CRB	512MB	512MB
Roku Streambar Pro (9101)	May 2021	Optical, HDMI 2.0a (ARC)	Requires compatible USB Ethernet adapter	USB-A 2.0: Ethernet, Mass Storage	No	Yes	Yes	HDR10, HLG	No	Remote & Stream to smartphone	Yes	Yes	a/b/g/n/ac dual-band MIMO	Yes	Voice, Headphone Jack	MStar C2	1GB	512MB

Eleventh generation
Model	Introduced	Ports				Video output				Audio output			Wireless		Remote	Processor	Memory	Storage
Model	Introduced	Optical, HDMI	Ethernet	USB	micro SD	HD	4K	Dolby Vision/HDR10+/ HDR10/HLG	QMS/VRR	Analog	DTS	Dolby Atmos	802.11	Bluetooth	Remote	Processor	Memory	Storage
Roku Ultra (4850)	Sep 2024	HDMI 2.1b	10/100 Mbps	USB-A 3.0: Mass Storage	No	Yes	Yes	All	Yes	Stream to smartphone	Yes	Decoder, AC4, MAT 2.0	a/b/g/n/ac/ax dual-band MIMO	Yes	Voice, Lost Remote, Rechargeable	Realtek 1619BRV	2GB	4GB
Roku Streaming Stick HD (3840)	May 2025	HDMI 1.4b	Requires compatible USB Ethernet adapter	USB-C 2.0: Power, Ethernet, Mass Storage (requires OTG adapter)	No	Yes	No	No	Yes	Stream to smartphone	Yes	Yes	a/b/g/n dual-band	OS15+	Voice	Realtek 1312CRB	512MB	512MB
Roku Streaming Stick Plus (3830)	May 2025	HDMI 2.1b	Requires compatible USB Ethernet adapter	USB-C 2.0: Power, Ethernet, Mass Storage (requires OTG adapter)	No	Yes	Yes	HDR10+, HDR10, HLG	Yes	Stream to smartphone	Yes	Yes	a/b/g/n/ac dual-band MIMO	OS15+	Voice	Amlogic S905Y5R	1GB	4GB
Roku Streambar SE (9104)	Sep 2024	Optical, HDMI 2.0a (ARC)	Requires compatible USB Ethernet adapter	USB-A 2.0: Ethernet, Mass Storage	No	Yes	Yes	HDR10+, HDR10, HLG	Yes	Stream to Smartphone	No	No	a/b/g/n/ac dual-band MIMO	Yes	IR	Realtek 1315CRB	1GB	4GB

== Roku TV ==
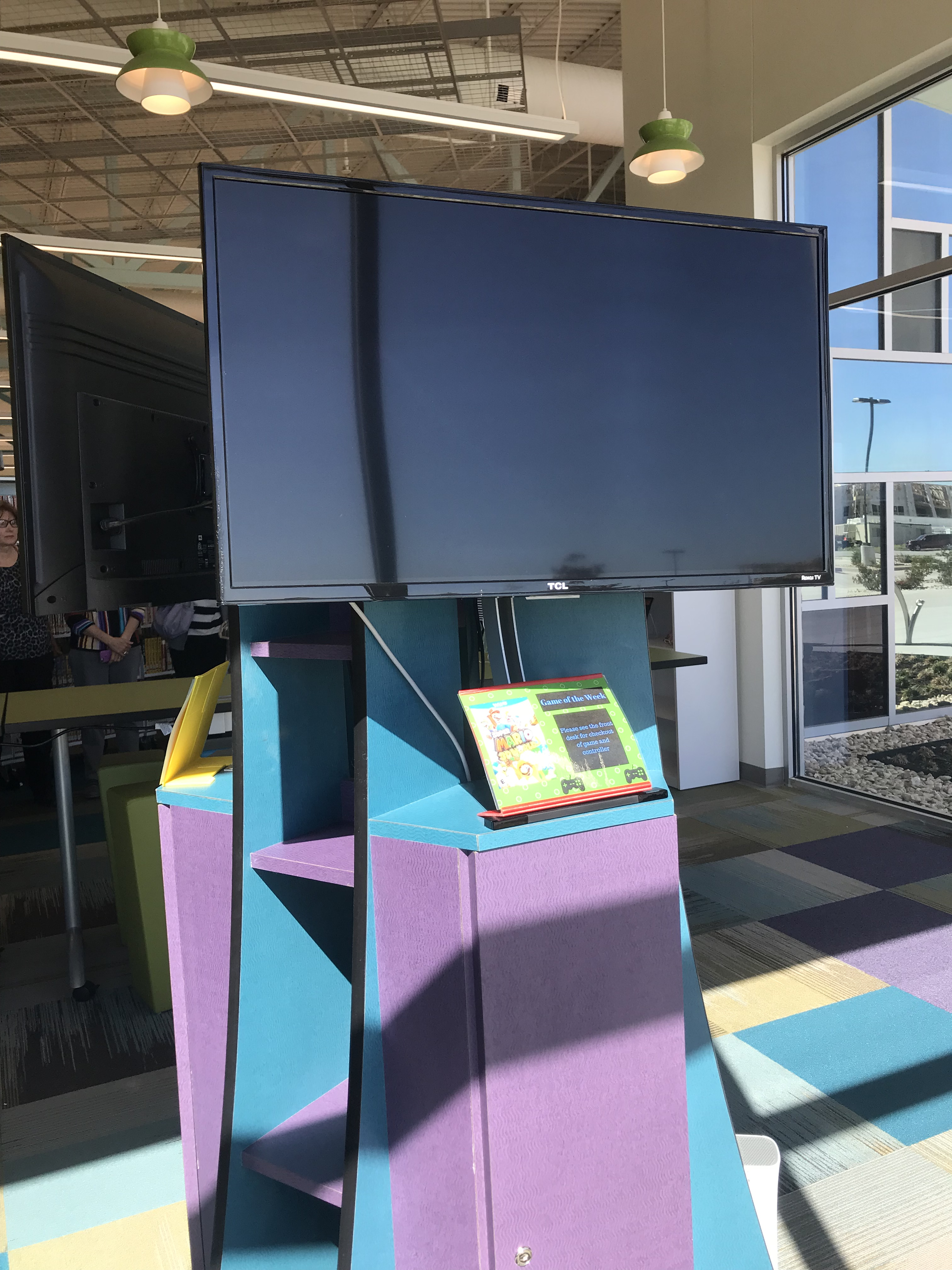
A TCL Roku TV

Roku announced its first branded smart TV and it was released in late 2014. These TVs are manufactured by companies like TCL, LG, Westinghouse, Panasonic, Philips, Haier, Hitachi, Toshiba, and Hisense, and use the Roku user interface as the "brain" of the TV. Roku TVs are updated just like the streaming devices. More recent models also integrate a set of features for use with over-the-air TV signals, including a program guide that provides information for shows and movies available on local antenna broadcast TV, as well as where that content is available to stream, and the ability to pause live TV (although the feature requires a USB hard drive with at least 16GB storage).

On November 14, 2019, Walmart and Roku announced that they would be selling Roku TVs under the Onn brand exclusively at Walmart stores, starting November 29.

In January 2020, Roku created a badge to certify devices as working with a Roku TV model. The first certified brands were TCL North America, Sound United, Polk Audio, Marantz, Definitive Technology, and Classé.

In January 2021, a Roku executive said one out of three smart TVs sold in the United States and Canada came with Roku's operating system built-in.

In May 2022, Roku and Element Electronics announced the first ever outdoor Roku TV, sold in 55 inch size. The television offers minimal reflection, an anti-glare display, 4K streaming, and can be used in bright outdoor environments.

In March 2023, Roku announced a partnership with Best Buy in which the retailer will exclusively sell the Roku Select and Plus Series TVs manufactured by Roku.

== Roku OS ==
Roku OS is a Linux-based operating system software developed by Roku, Inc. It works as a streaming platform which hosts both free and paid streaming channels. The operating system initially powered Roku's streaming players in 2004, extended support for smart TVs designed specifically for streaming players and smart TVs in 2014, and since also to Roku-branded home entertainment devices such as smart speakers, as of 2023.

== Content and programming ==
Roku provides video services from a number of Internet-based video on demand providers.

=== Roku channels ===
Content on Roku devices is provided by Roku partners and is identified using the term channel. Users can add or remove different channels using the Roku Channel Store or the search feature. Roku's website does not specify which channels are free to its users.

=== Service creation for Roku Player ===
The Roku is an open-platform device with a freely available software development kit that enables anyone to create new channels. The channels are written in a Roku-specific language called BrightScript, a scripting language the company describes as 'unique', but "similar to Visual Basic" and "similar to JavaScript".

Developers who wish to test their channels before a general release, or who wish to limit viewership, can create "private" channels that require a code be entered by the user in the account page of the Roku website. These private channels, which are not part of the official Roku Channel Store, are not reviewed or certified by Roku.

There is an NDK (Native Developer Kit) available, though it has added restrictions.

=== The Roku Channel ===
Roku launched its own streaming channel on its devices in October 2017. It is ad-supported, but free. Its licensed content includes movies and TV shows from studios such as Lionsgate, MGM, Paramount, Sony Pictures Entertainment, Warner Bros., Disney, and Universal as well as Roku channel content publishers American Classics, FilmRise, Nosey, OVGuide, Popcornflix, Vidmark, and YuYu. It is implementing an ad revenue sharing model with content providers. On August 8, 2018, the Roku Channel became available on the web as well. Roku also added the "Featured Free" section as the top section of its main menu from which users can get access to direct streaming of shows and movies from its partners.

In January 2019, premium subscription options from select content providers were added to the Roku Channel. Originally only available in the U.S., it launched in the UK on April 7, 2020, with a different selection of movies and TV shows, and without premium subscription add-ons.

On January 8, 2021, Roku announced that it had acquired the original content library of the defunct mobile video service Quibi for an undisclosed amount, reported to be around $100 million. The content is being rebranded as Roku Originals.

=== Howdy ===
On August 5, 2025, Roku launched Howdy, an ad-free, subscription streaming service. The streaming service costs subscribers $2.99 per month and includes nearly 10,000 hours of content.

=== Frndly TV ===
In May of 2025, Roku acquired Frndly TV for $185 million. Frndly TV had already been available on Roku devices prior to the acquisition announcement. The acquisition gives Roku a greater presence in live television streaming.

== Controversies ==
=== Non-certified channels ===
The Daily Beast alleged that non-certified channels on Roku eased access to materials promoting conspiracy theories and terrorism content.

In June 2017, a Mexico City court banned the sale of Roku products in Mexico, following claims by Televisa (via its Izzi cable subsidiary) that the devices were being used for subscription-based streaming services that illegally stream television content without permission from copyright holders. The devices used Roku's private channels feature to install the services, which were all against the terms of service Roku applies for official channels available in its store. Roku defended itself against the allegations as such, stating that these channels were not officially certified and that the company takes active measures to stop illegal streaming services. The 11th Collegiate Court in Mexico City overturned the decision in October 2018, with Roku returning to the Mexican market soon after; Televisa's streaming service Blim TV (now Vix) would also launch on the platform.

In August 2017 Roku began to display a prominent disclaimer when non-certified channels are added, warning that channels enabling piracy may be removed "without prior notice". In mid-May 2018, a software glitch caused some users to see copyright takedown notices on legitimate services such as Netflix and YouTube. Roku acknowledged and patched the glitch.

In March 2022, the private channel system was deprecated due to abuse and replaced with a more limited and strict beta channels platform which only allows twenty users to test a channel for up to four months.

=== Carriage disputes ===
Pay television-styled carriage disputes emerged on the Roku platform in 2020, as the company requires providers to agree to revenue sharing for subscription services that are billed through the platform, and to hold 30% of advertising inventory. On September 18 of that same year, Roku announced that NBCUniversal TV Everywhere services would be removed from its devices "as early as this weekend", due to its refusal to carry the company's streaming service Peacock (which had been unavailable on Roku since its launch in July 2020) under terms it deemed "unreasonable". It reached an agreement with NBCUniversal later that day, which allowed Peacock to become available on Roku. HBO Max, which launched in May 2020, was unavailable on Roku until December 2020 due to similar disputes over revenue sharing, particularly in regards to an upcoming ad-supported tier. On December 17, 2020, HBO Max began streaming on Roku, after WarnerMedia and Roku reached a deal the previous day (and also after media speculation that WarnerMedia moving Wonder Woman 1984 and Warner Bros' 2021 theatrical slate to a hybrid theatrical/HBO Max release model were an attempt to get Roku to agree to their terms).

Another dispute, starting mid-December 2020, caused Spectrum customers to be unable to download the Spectrum TV streaming app to their Roku devices; existing customers could retain the app, but would lose it upon deletion, even to fix software bugs. This dispute was resolved on August 17, 2021.

On April 30, 2021, Roku removed the over-the-top television service YouTube TV from its Channels Store, preventing it from being downloaded. The company accused operator Google LLC of making demands regarding its YouTube app that it considered "predatory, anti-competitive and discriminatory", including enhanced access to customer data, giving YouTube greater prominence in Roku's search interface, and requiring that Roku implement specific hardware standards that could increase the cost of its devices. Roku accused Google of "leveraging its YouTube monopoly to force an independent company into an agreement that is both bad for consumers and bad for fair competition." Google claimed that Roku had "terminated our deal in bad faith amidst our negotiation", stating that it wanted to renew the "existing reasonable terms" under which Roku offered YouTube TV. Google denied Roku's claims regarding customer data and prominence of the YouTube app, and stated that its carriage of a YouTube app was under a separate agreement, and unnecessarily brought into negotiations. As a partial workaround, YouTube began to deploy an update to its main app on Roku and other platforms, which integrates the YouTube TV service. On December 8, 2021 (a day before the agreement for the main YouTube app expired), Roku and Google announced that they had settled their dispute and reached a multi-year agreement to keep the YouTube app on Roku and to restore the YouTube TV app on Roku.

== See also ==
- Comparison of digital media players
- SoundBridge, another Roku product
- Smart TV
- Roku City
