= The Roku Channel =

Free streaming video service

- Developer: Roku, Inc.
- Key people: Charlie Collier (President)
- Type: OTT platform
- Launched: September 2017; 9 years ago
- Platforms: List of platforms: TV: Roku, Amazon Fire TV, Android TV, Apple TV, Chromecast with Google TV, Samsung Tizen; Mobile: iOS, Android; Browser: PCs, mobile phones, tablets
- Status: Active
- Members: ▲145 million people (2024)
- Pricing model: Free with ad support, optional paid subscriptions
- Availability: United States, Canada, Mexico, United Kingdom
- Website: therokuchannel.roku.com

The Roku Channel is an over-the-top streaming television service available in the United States, Canada, Mexico and the United Kingdom. The service was launched in September 2017, and is owned and operated by Roku, Inc. It is the most popular free ad-supported streaming television (FAST) service in the U.S., reaching 145 million people, as of 2024.

The Roku Channel includes over 500 free channels, more than 80,000 free movies and shows, and access to paid content. The service is available through streaming devices, such as Fire TV, Apple TV, Android TV, on smart TVs by Roku as well as other brands, such as Samsung, with the Roku mobile app, and web browsers running on PCs, tablets or mobile phones. As of 2025, the channel ranks as the fifth most-watched streaming service in the U.S., gathering over 6% of all U.S. TV streaming time.

== History ==
=== 2017–2019: Launch in North America ===
The Roku Channel was launched in September 2017 as a free, ad-supported streaming television service ("FAST"), available to viewers in the U.S. Roku's CEO Anthony Wood stated in the same month that the channel was a "way for content owners to publish their content on Roku without writing an app". By August 2018, the channel had expanded to Canada, and a website version of the service was launched, allowing it to be accessed via any web browser. In August 2018, The Roku Channel was also reported to have signed content licensing deals with Sony Pictures, Warner Bros., Metro-Goldwyn-Mayer, Lionsgate, Disney and Paramount Pictures. Additionally, the service offered content from existing partners including American Classics, FilmRise, Nosey, OVGuide, Popcornflix, Vidmark and YuYu. On August 19, 2019, The Roku Channel added its Kids & Family section, with content from partners including Hasbro's Allspark, DHX Media, Lionsgate, Mattel Television and Moonbug Entertainment.

=== 2020–2023: Service expansion ===
April 2020 saw the launch of The Roku Channel in the UK. In January 2021, Roku announced that it had acquired the original content library of the defunct mobile video service Quibi for an undisclosed amount, reported to be around $100 million, for availability on The Roku Channel. The content was rebranded as Roku Originals. In August 2021, The Roku Channel was reported to add CBC, AccuWeather Now, FilmRise True Crime, Haunt TV and IGN for free streaming.

By March 2022, The Roku Channel included news services such as ABC News, Bloomberg, Cheddar, NBC News, Newsy, People TV, Reuters, USA Today, WeatherNation and Yahoo Finance, all available for free streaming. In October 2022, The Roku Channel was launched in Mexico. According to Deadline Hollywood, October 2022 also saw Charlie Collier, previously the CEO of Fox Entertainment, join Roku as the President of Roku Media to manage ad platform business and content for The Roku Channel and more. Later, in December 2022, Roku announced that it would sign an agreement with the Miss Universe Organization to broadcast the 70th (2022) and 71st (2023) editions of the Miss Universe beauty pageant in the United States, making the first time the pageant would broadcast on streaming television, after several years on linear television.

By the end of 2022, The Roku Channel was offering premium subscriptions for over 50 services including Discovery+, Paramount+, MGM+, Showtime, Starz, HBO, AMC+, Shudder and Acorn TV. Moreover, The Roku Channel was reaching U.S. households with a total population of 100 million, in Roku's estimates. The Roku Channel was also reportedly the most popular FAST service in the U.S. in 2021 and 2022.

In February 2023, BGR reported that Roku announced the addition of nearly 2000 hours of on-demand content to The Roku Channel. This content included offerings from HBO, HBO Max, Discovery Channel, HGTV, Food Network, TLC, Warner Bros. Pictures and Warner Bros. Television. Moreover, this content would be available to stream for free.

In August 2023, it was reported that The Roku Channel was adding several NBCUniversal services as free, ad-supported options. These included NBC News Now, Dateline, Today All Day, NBC local stations, regional Telemundo news channels, Universal Action, Alfred Hitchcock Presents, Sky News International, The Rotten Tomatoes Channel and a Universal Crime channel. Further, The Roku Channel became available on Google TV and other Android TV OS devices, in addition to Roku-branded streaming devices and smart TVs, Amazon Fire TVs, Apple TV and Samsung smart TVs. Moreover, a report by Variety in September 2023 stated that The Roku Channel offered more than 80,000 TV shows and movies and access to premium content. Variety also reported that U.S. FAST services, including Roku, Pluto TV, Samsung SmartTV+ and Vizio WatchFree+, had "commercial loads" of about 8 to 9 minutes per hour, compared to 15 to 17 minutes per hour on cable TV.

=== 2024–present: Viewership growth ===
In January 2024, Roku announced an agreement with Formula E to air all but 5 races per year. Roku was slated to also air Recharge, a studio program aired 24 hours after every race. According to The Wrap in February 2024, The Roku Channel offered over 400 free live linear TV channels and distributed content from over 250 partners. In April 2024, National Basketball Association (NBA) announced a partnership with Roku to launch "NBA Fast", the first FAST channel from NBA, on The Roku Channel. Roku also announced an agreement with NBA to air more than 40 NBA G League games during the 2024–25 season. In May 2024, The Roku Channel secured a multiyear rights agreement with Major League Baseball to stream live the league's Sunday Leadoff games for free.

In June 2024, measurement firm Comscore found The Roku Channel to be the most popular among all free, ad-supported streaming television (FAST) streaming services in the U.S. In the same month, Lifewire stated that The Roku Channel could be watched using the Roku mobile app, available for both iOS and Android, and allowed switching among free content, premium subscription services and live TV.

In August 2024, Roku launched a new FAST channel, Roku Sports Channel, to be made available on The Roku Channel. At launch, the sports channel would show live events from MLB Sunday Leadoff, Formula E and the NBA G League and live studio programming from The Rich Eisen Show and GMFB: Overtime. In February 2025, Roku announced it was launching a women's sports studio show, Women's Sports Now, featuring Renee Montgomery, Sarah Tiana and Suzy Shuster. In May 2025, Roku announced that The Roku Sports Channel would now stream on Samsung TV Plus as well.

The Roku Channel was the most watched U.S. based FAST service in November 2024, as per Nielsen's TV viewership data. It reached households representing nearly 145 million people by the end of 2024, in Roku's estimates. According to Nielsen in July 2025, the channel ranked as the fifth most-watched streaming service, trailing YouTube, Netflix, Disney-owned services and Amazon Prime Video. The service accounted for over 6% of all U.S. TV streaming time in September 2025.

== Content ==
=== Free, ad-supported streaming TV ===
The Roku Channel includes more than 500 free ad-supported streaming television (FAST) channels, as of November 2024. They include:

- News: ABC News Live, AccuWeather Now, America's Voice, Black News Channel, Bloomberg, CBC News, Cheddar, Dateline, LiveNow from Fox, LX News, NewsmaxTV Live, NBC News Now, NowThis, One America News Encore, Reuters, Scripps News, Sky News International, Telemundo regional news channels, The Young Turks-Go, Today All Day, USA Today, WeatherNation and Yahoo Finance.
- Movies: Alfred Hitchcock Presents, Cinevault, Cinevault Classics, Cinevault Westerns, FilmRise Action, FilmRise Classic TV, FilmRise Family, FilmRise Free Movies, Gravitas Movies, Haunt TV, IFC Films Picks, Movie Favorites by Lifetime, MovieSphere, Redbox Free Movies, Reelz, The Rotten Tomatoes Channel, Samuel Goldwyn Channel, Samuel Goldwyn Classics, Universal Action, Universal Monsters, XUMO FREE Movies, Roman movies, XUMO FREE Westerns and Warner Bros. TV At the Movies.
- Sports: ACC Digital Network, Adventure Sports Network, BeIN Sports Xtra, CBS Sports HQ, CBS Sports Gozalo Network (soccer), EDGESport, ESPN8 The Ocho, ESTV, FIFA Plus, FITE, Fox Sports, Fubo Sports Network, GolfPass, HBCU-Go Sports, MAVTV Select, MLB Channel, NBA Fast, NBC Sports NOW, NFL Channel, NHL Channel, PGA Tour, Outside TV, Pickleballtv, PowerNation, Racing America, SportsGrid, Stadium and Tennis Channel's T2
- Entertainment: Baywatch Remastered, BET Pluto, Bounce XL, BUZZR, The Carol Burnett Show, CMT Pluto, Circle Country, Comedy Central Pluto, Complex, Crunchyroll Channel, Deal or No Deal, Family Feud, Game Show Central, GOT Talent Global, Heartland, HerSphere, IGN, Ion, Ion Plus, Ion Mystery, Little House on the Prairie, The Lone Ranger, Midsomer Murders, MTV Pluto, Murder, She Wrote, People TV, SNL Vault and TMZ. Also Warner Music Group's WMX Pop, WMX Rock and WMX Hip-Hop
- Music: MTV Biggest Pop, MTV Block Party and Yo! MTV
- Kids: Barney and Friends, Bob the Builder, Caillou, Fireman Sam, PBS Retro, Power Rangers, Rainbow Ruby, Rev and Roll, Ryan and Friends, Sonic the Hedgehog, Teenage Mutant Ninja Turtles, Teletubbies and Yo Gabba Gabba!
- Home Design and Lifestyle: A+E Lively Place, Architectural Digest, Bon Appétit, The Bob Ross Channel, Condé Nast Traveler, The Design Network, DIY Daily, Glamour, GQ, Food52, PBS Food, Revry, Tiny House Nation, Warner Bros. TV Welcome Home, Vanity Fair, Tastemade, This Old House and Vogue
- Comedy: AFV Family, Anger Management, Are We There Yet?, Comedy Central Pluto TV, Comedy Dynamics, Funny or Die, GETComedy, TNBC and Just for Laughs Gags
- Crime: Cold Case Files, Crime360, Crime and Unsolved Mysteries, FilmRise True Crime, Forensic Files, On Patrol: Live, Oxygen True Crime Archives, Reel Truth, Reelz Famous and Infamous, Universal Crime channel by NBCUniversal and Warner Bros. TV Crime Scenes.
- Reality: All Reality by We TV, Deal Zone, FailArmy, Fear Factor, UFO Cowboys, Ghost Hunters, Hell's Kitchen, Kitchen Nightmares, Ice Road Truckers, People Are Awesome, Pet Collective, Real Housewives Vault and Wipeout
- Sci-Fi: The Asylum, Classic Doctor Who, DUST, FilmRise Sci-Fi, MGM's Free Sci-Fi Movies & Series, UnExplained Zone and Warner Bros. TV Mysterious Worlds
- Science & Nature: BBC Earth, WIRED, Love Nature, Modern Marvels, Voyager Documentaries and Warner Bros. TV How-To
- Talk Shows: Hot Ones, Nosey and Real Nosey
- Spanish language: AFV en Español, América TeVé, beIN SPORTS, Canela.TV, Estrella TV, Latido Music, Love Nature en Español, Moovimex, Pongalo NovelaClub, TelevisaUnivision, The Weather Channel en Español., among others.

=== Advertising video on demand ===
The Roku Channel offers viewers to watch a selection of advertising video on demand (AVOD) content for free, requiring no subscription fee. This content includes movies from Hollywood studios such as Lionsgate, Metro-Goldwyn-Mayer (MGM), Sony Pictures and Warner Brothers, and videos from publishers such as American Classics, Fandor, FilmRise, Nosey, OVGuide, Popcornflix, Vidmark and YuYu. The channel also delivers about 2000 hours of content from Warner Bros. Discovery's TV series and movies, including content from HBO, HBO Max, Discovery Channel, HGTV, Food Network, TLC, Warner Bros. Pictures, Warner Bros. Television and more. Moreover, it offers for free a part of the "premium content" from Showtime, MGM+, Cinedigm and Acorn TV, with no subscription or trial required. The offering includes On Becoming a God in Central Florida (Showtime), Godfather of Harlem (Epix), America: The Story of Us (HISTORY Vault), Heartland (Dove Channel) and Miss Fisher's Murder Mysteries (Acorn TV).

The Spanish AVOD titles free to watch on The Roku Channel include Hernan (A+E Networks), Hunting Ava Bravo (Wild Sheep Content, Top Dead Center Films, Chollawood Productions), A la Mala (Lionsgate), Enamorada (Cisneros), Amor Comprado (Cisneros), Seasons 1–3 of El Señor de los Cielos (NBCUniversal Telemundo), El Chema: Edición Especial (NBCUniversal Telemundo), Seasons 1–2 of Señora Acero (NBCUniversal Telemundo).

The Roku Channel also includes original content, including that in Spanish, in form of Roku Originals. Content creation partners for the Roku Originals include Cisley Saldaña, Liz Jenkins, Mariel Saldaña, Paul Hollywood, Prue Leith, Rich Eisen and "Weird Al" Yankovic. Spanish-language content creation partners include Jennifer Lopez, Juanpa Zurita and Jaime Camil.

=== Paid subscriptions ===
The Roku Channel offers paid subscriptions for various services including Discovery+, Paramount+, HBO Max, MGM+, Showtime, Starz, Cinemax, AMC+, Shudder, Acorn TV, Fuse Plus, Vix Premium, Yippee TV, and Howdy. Howdy is a Roku owned and operated streaming bundle which Roku CEO Anthony Wood described in an August 5, 2025 announcement: “Priced at less than a cup of coffee, Howdy is ad-free and designed to complement, not compete with, premium services”.

=== Live sports programming ===
Sports programming primarily airs on the Roku Sports Channel.

- Formula E (2024–present)
  - 11 races
- NBA G League (2024–present)
  - 40 games
- Major League Baseball (2024–2025)
  - 18 MLB Sunday Leadoff games
- WCK Muay Thai (2024)
  - WCK Muay Thai 35th Anniversary event
- X Games (2025–present)
  - Exclusive streaming of X Games Aspen and a major summer X Games event
- National Wrestling Alliance (NWA) (2025–present)
  - Exclusive streaming of NWA Powerrr in the United States, Canada and Mexico
- Pro Volleyball Federation (2025–present)
  - 20 matches
- Bass Anglers Sportsman Society (2025–present)
  - Coverage of Bassmaster Elite Qualifiers
  - Select coverage of all Bassmaster Elite Series events
  - 5 Bassmaster Open Series events
  - Friday coverage of the Bassmaster Classic
  - Primetime coverage of the Bassmaster Classic Celebrity Pro-Am
