= Xumo =

American streaming media company

Xumo, LLC
- Type: Joint venture
- Industry: Streaming media
- Founded: 2011; 15 years ago
- Headquarters: Irvine, California, United States
- Area served: United States; Canada; Mexico; Brazil; Western Europe (select countries)
- Key people: Colin Petrie-Norris (CEO); Jiro Egawa (COO); Chris Hall (SVP, Product); Hirotaka Oku (SVP, Engineering); Stefan Van Engen (SVP, Programming & Partnerships); Fern Feistel (SVP, Marketing & Content Operations)
- Products: Xumo TV, Xumo Stream Box and Xumo Play
- Services: OTT Internet television Smart TV Operating System
- Owner: Comcast (50%); Charter Communications (50%)
- Parent: Xfinity (2020-2022)
- Website: www.xumo.com

Xumo, LLC (/ˈzuːmoʊ/ ZOO-moh) is an American internet television and consumer electronics company. It is a joint venture of Charter Communications and Comcast that operates the free ad-supported streaming television (FAST) and advertising video on demand (AVOD) service Xumo Play. It develops digital media players and smart TVs. The Xumo Play platform's service operations are based in the Orange County suburb of Irvine, California. As of October 2020, Xumo Play has 24 million monthly active users.

Founded in 2011, it was initially a joint venture between Viant Technology and Panasonic; Time Inc. later acquired Viant's stake, and the service as a whole was acquired by Comcast in 2020, seeking to use it as a complement to its paid streaming service Peacock. In 2022, Comcast announced that Xumo would become a joint venture with Charter; under the venture, Comcast also contributed its digital media player and smart TV businesses—which are based on Xfinity's X1 software platform—to the company under the Xumo Stream Box and Xumo TV brands.

== History ==
Xumo was founded in 2011 as a joint venture between the Viant Technology subsidiary of Meredith Corporation (then the parent company of Myspace) and Panasonic.

In 2015, only Vizio and Panasonic offered the service. Other manufacturers added Xumo in 2016, including LG Electronics and Funai. As of May 2016, 78 channels were offered, with a total of 100 planned. The primary target audience was described as millennials who are not satisfied with multichannel television offerings.

In February 2016, Time Inc. acquired Viant. The Vanderhook brothers began the company in 1999 as advertisementbanners.com, changing the name to Interactive Media Holdings in 2003 and Viant in 2015.

By July 2018, the Android app was live and available for download on the Google Play Store. By June 2019, according to CEO Colin Petrie-Norris, Xumo was available in over 35 million American households via a multiscreen distribution network of smart TVs, mobile devices, the web, and streaming boxes. At the time, Xumo did not offer its service outside smart TV platforms, including Channel Plus on LG's WebOS sets sold by Viant on some channels.

Xumo can learn what users watch, adding frequently viewed channels and programs to the top of lists.

On February 25, 2020, Comcast announced it would purchase Xumo from the Panasonic/Viant joint venture for an undisclosed sum. The acquisition of the service—which would continue to operate as an independent business, albeit within Comcast's cable television division—stems mainly from Xumo's partnerships with smart TV manufacturers (including LG, Panasonic, and Vizio), which would allow Comcast to use Xumo's placement to market or showcase Xfinity and other Comcast services as well as use its technology to develop additional streaming platforms. The company added content from the NBCUniversal programming library and its various television networks, and added its channels as a complementary part of Peacock, akin to Paramount's use of Pluto TV to offer content from its cable networks following the former Viacom's purchase of the competitor in 2019.

On November 19, 2020, Xumo announced it would begin producing its own original content for the service, starting with Bold Soul Studios' movie White Elephant.

In April 2022, Comcast announced that it would contribute Xumo to a new joint venture with Charter Communications, which will also include retail sales of streaming devices and smart TVs powered by Comcast's X1 platform. It was announced later in November that this joint venture would retain the Xumo name, with the streaming service slightly rebranded as Xumo Play, and Comcast's Xfinity Flex and XClass TV rebranded as Xumo Stream Box and Xumo TV, respectively.

In January 2023, Xumo announced plans to launch Xumo TV—a line of smart TVs from Element Electronics—later that year. It also launched Xumo TV models from Hisense and TCL Technology (marketed under the Pioneer brand), which are exclusive to Best Buy.

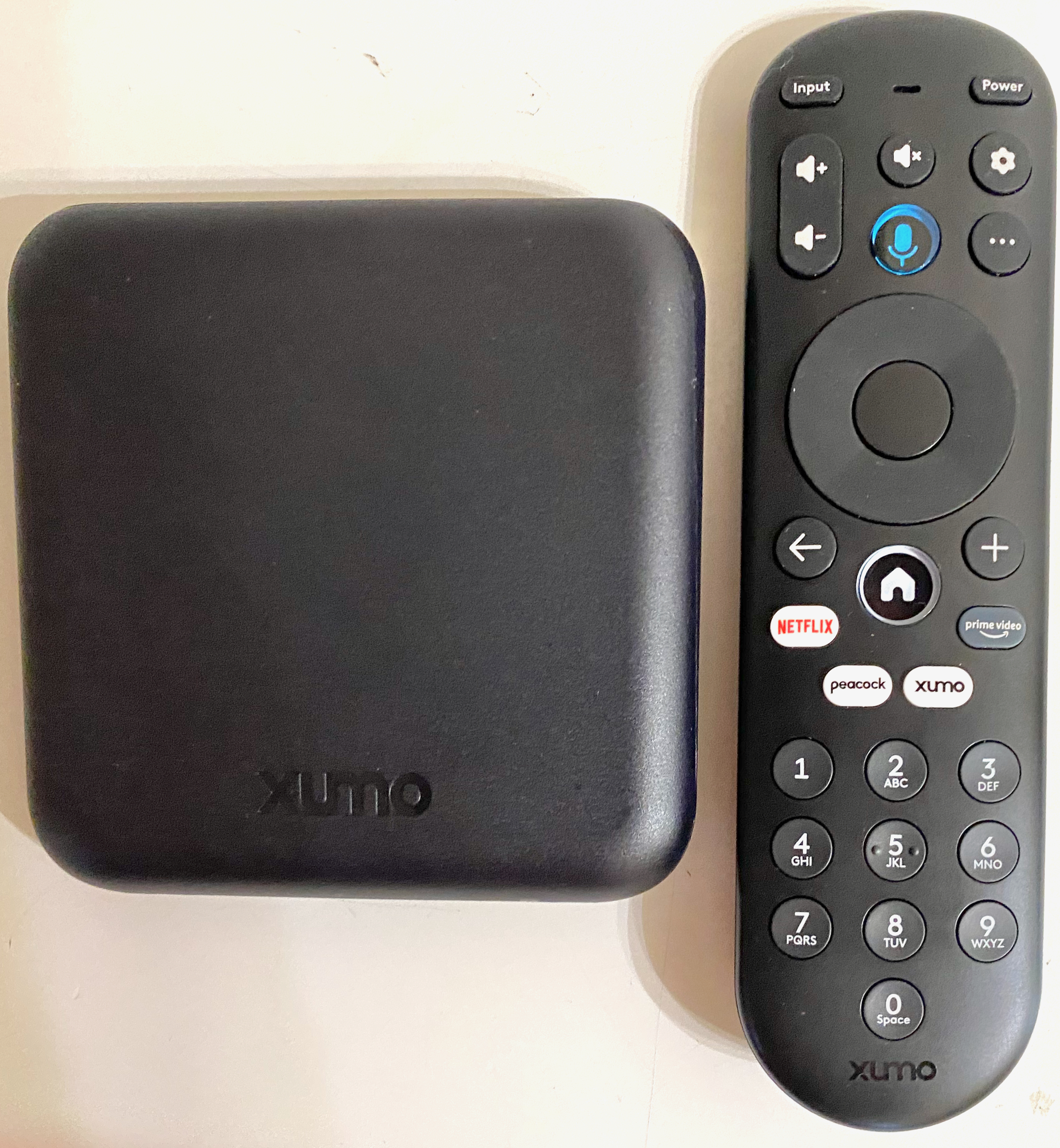
A Xumo Stream Box digital media player device, which will be distributed by Xfinity and Spectrum, along with retail stores

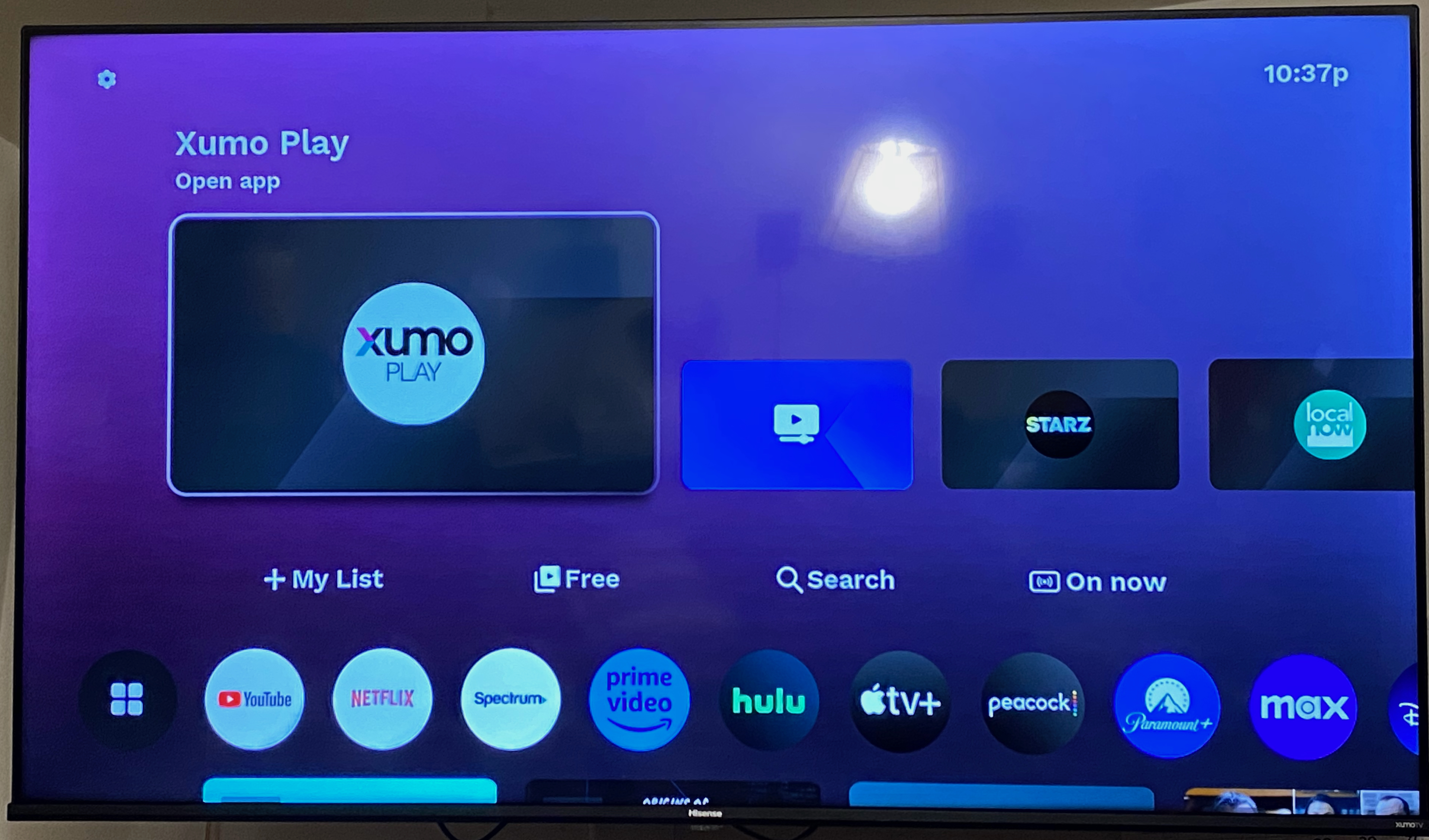
A Xumo TV manufactured by Hisense, demonstrating the "Entertainment OS" user interface to be utilized by Xumo-compatible devices

== Programming ==
Xumo is structured similarly to the pay television model, offering its content as designated channels categorized by program content type into 12 channel tiers:

- News – consisting of mainstream news and opinion channels, as well as partisan, commentary-based outlets reflecting progressive and conservative viewpoints.
- TV & Movies – general entertainment and movie channels.
- Sports – includes live and previously aired events, sporting news, and analysis programs.
- Kids & Family – channels aimed at children and family audiences.
- Food, Drink, and Travel – culinary and travel-oriented lifestyle channels.
- Comedy – comedy-based channels, consisting of curated viral video and digital content services.
- Entertainment – consisting of special-interest and viral video-based entertainment channels.
- Lifestyle – lifestyle, travel, and home shopping channels
- Pop Culture – entertainment news, science, technology, sci-fi, curated video, and geek culture-oriented channels.
- Science & Tech – science, technology, and educational documentary channels.
- Music – consisting of music videos and video concerts.
- Fashion – style-oriented channels.

As of January 2, 2026, Xumo carries over 190 channels, packaging content acquired through various syndication and digital content deals. Current content partnerships for the service include the sister company NBCUniversal, Versant, A&E Networks, Abrams Media, Advance Publications, CNET, Condé Nast, FBE, Sony Pictures, FilmRise, Fox Corporation, Fremantle, Jukin Media, Kabillion, Katz Networks, Gray Media, People Inc., NowThis, Paramount Skydance, PocketWatch, Refinery29, Stingray Group, This Old House Ventures, Time USA, LLC, Vin Di Bona Productions, and Warner Bros. Discovery.

Traditional television channels whose direct or curated feeds are offered on Xumo include History, Fuse, Sky News, USA Network (plus sister network Syfy, E!, CNBC and MS NOW), NASA TV, MTV (plus sister network Showtime, VH1 and Nickelodeon), CNN (plus sister network HLN, Discovery Channel, HBO and Cartoon Network), Euronews, Bloomberg Television, Newsmax TV, Scripps News, Fox News (and sister network Fox Business), Home Shopping Network (HSN), QVC, Jewelry Television, Reelz, Shop LC, BeIN Sports Xtra, and Stadium. AVOD services whose feeds are carried on Xumo include NBC News Now, ABC News Live, CBS News 24/7 (plus sister network CBS Sports HQ and ET Live), LiveNow from Fox, Cheddar News, TYT Network (structured as a hybrid SVOD/AVOD service, but offered by Xumo as an AVOD offering), Nosey, Dove Channel, Law & Crime, Fubo Sports Network, and People TV.

== Availability ==
Xumo content can be streamed through several desktop, mobile and internet-connected TV platforms including: Android and Apple iOS/iPadOS devices, Chromecast, Android TV, Apple TV, Xfinity Xumo TV box (formerly Flex), Amazon Fire TV, Roku, Cox Contour Stream Player, LG Channel Plus and LG Channels set models, and Smart TV models manufactured by Vizio, Panasonic, Sanyo, Philips, Magnavox, Samsung, Xiaomi, Hisense, Sony, TCL and Sharp Corporation. Outside the contiguous United States, Xumo and its supported apps are currently available on LG Smart TV models powering its Channel Plus and LG Channels platforms distributed in Canada (on Channel Plus platforms running WebOS 3.5 or above), Mexico, Brazil, France, Germany, Spain, Italy and the United Kingdom (on LG smart TVs running WebOS 4.5 or above), however offer was stopped in 2024.
