= LiveNow from Fox =

American steaming news channel

- Country: United States
- Broadcast area: Worldwide
- Affiliates: Fox One
- Headquarters: 511 W Adams St.; Phoenix, AZ 85003; U.S.

Programming
- Language: English

Ownership
- Owner: Fox Corporation
- Parent: Fox Television Stations
- Sister channels: Fox News; Fox Business; Fox Broadcasting Company; Fox Weather

History
- Launched: 2014; 12 years ago
- Former names: NewsNow from FOX (2014–2020); CoronavirusNow (March–September 2020)

Links
- Website: www.livenowfox.com

Availability

Streaming media
- Fox One: fox.com: (American cable internet subscribers only; requires subscription, trial, or television provider login to access content)
- YouTube: Watch live
- Online stream: Watch live
- Service(s): Fox One, FuboTV, Google TV, Hulu + Live TV, LG Channels, Pluto TV, Prime Video Live TV, Samsung TV Plus, Sling Freestream, The Roku Channel, Tubi, Vizio Watch Free+, Xumo, YouTube TV

LiveNow from Fox (stylized as LiveNOW from FOX) is a streaming video television network operated by Fox Television Stations, a division of Fox Corporation. The channel carries live coverage of breaking news events throughout the day on several streaming and smart TV platforms.

On-air hosts include Alexandra Goldberg, Andy Mac, Anna Marsick, Austin Westfall, Bowen Kedrowicz, Carel Lajara, Christina Evans, Christy Matino, Daniel Burbank, Josh Breslow, Mike Pache, Ryan Schmelz, Shawna Khalafi, Stephanie Coueignoux and Tyler Manion.

== Operation ==
The programming is often handled by a single digital journalist who simultaneously narrates live coverage and operates a video switcher, leveraging resources, on-air talent and raw material from the Fox News Channel and its local news affiliates.

The digital journalists work out of Fox's owned-and-operated stations in Phoenix, Arizona (KSAZ-TV) and Orlando, Florida (WOFL), presenting an estimated 100 hours a week of live coverage.

== History ==
The service originated as Fox 10 News Now, a webcast that had been run by KSAZ-TV in 2014. It gained a large following on YouTube in 2016 when it carried president Donald Trump's rallies and other live events uninterrupted and in their entirety.

In 2020, the channel transitioned and rebranded to a national product called News Now from Fox. Later that year amid the COVID-19 pandemic, the channel rebranded to "CoronavirusNow," dedicating itself to coverage of the pandemic. Later that year, it took on its current name and format.

In July 2026, LiveNOW from FOX expanded to 24-hour live programming, providing continuous coverage of breaking news and live events.
