= Howdy (streaming service) =

American video on-demand streaming service

- Developer: Roku, Inc.
- Key people: Anthony Wood (chairman & CEO, Roku, Inc.); Charlie Collier (President, Roku Media)
- Type: OTT platform
- Launched: August 5, 2025; 15 months ago
- Platforms: List of platforms: TV: Roku, Amazon Fire TV, Android TV, Apple TV, Chromecast with Google TV, Samsung Tizen; Mobile: iOS, Android; Browser: PCs, mobile phones, tablets
- Status: Active
- Pricing model: Subscription
- Availability: United States and Mexico
- Website: howdy.tv

Howdy is an American subscription video on-demand over-the-top streaming service available in the United States. The service was launched in 2025, and is owned and operated by Roku, Inc.

== History ==
Howdy launched on August 5, 2025, and is Roku’s first subscription streaming service. Roku already owns The Roku Channel which is a free streaming service. Howdy is ad-free and will cost subscribers $2.99 per month. It currently features around 10,000 hours worth of content. Howdy has over 1 million subscribers after six months of its launch.The service costs less than what Roku characterizes as "premium" streaming services, and the company does not intend to compete with them. Howdy includes content from Lionsgate, FilmRise, Sony Pictures, Disney, NBCUniversal and Warner Bros. Pictures. The service aims to provide a curated catalog of older mainstream movies and shows, with a "thin layer" of unscripted Roku Originals on top. Roku Founder and CEO, Anthony Wood, has described Howdy's content as “for people who want a less expensive option that doesn’t have ads”. Wood pointed to "iconic rom-coms, medical dramas, '90s comedy, feel-good classics" as representative examples.

Howdy was released in Mexico in April 2026.

Howdy was released in Belarus in May 2026.

Howdy was released in Australia in June 2026.

Howdy was released in Canada in July 2026.
