= ReplayTV =

Brand of DVR

- Type: Division
- Industry: Digital video recorders
- Founded: September 1997
- Founder: Anthony Wood
- Defunct: December 19, 2005 (hardware); July 20, 2015 (guide service)
- Fate: Dissolved as a result of parent company’s, bankruptcy
- Headquarters: Santa Clara, California
- Products: ReplayTV personal video recorders
- Parent: Digital Networks North America

ReplayTV was a former DVR company that from 1999 until 2005, produced a brand of digital video recorders (DVR), a term synonymous with personal video recorder (PVR). It is a consumer video device which allows users to capture television programming to internal hard disk storage for later viewing (and time shifting). ReplayTV was founded in September 1997 by future Roku founder Anthony Wood, who was president and CEO of ReplayTV until August 2001.

The first ReplayTV model was introduced in January 1999 during the Consumer Electronics Show in Las Vegas, at the same time as a competing DVR model from rival company TiVo. After the sale of assets to DirecTV, ReplayTV's only ongoing activity was maintenance of the electronic program guide service by D&M Holdings, which was to be discontinued on July 31, 2011. However, on July 29, 2011, a notice was placed on the ReplayTV website stating that service would be continued without interruption for lifetime subscribers and monthly subscribers may have a short interruption in service. On September 2, 2011, programming contact through the ReplayTV dialup system was terminated without any update message being sent to subscribers or posted on replaytv.com. DNNA filed for bankruptcy on July 20, 2015. EPG data from their servers ran out on July 15, 2015. Even with the end of support from DNNA, third-party solutions are available to provide Electronic Program Guide data to ReplayTV units.

== History ==
ReplayTV was founded in September 1997 by businessman Anthony Wood, who later founded Roku in October 2002. Initial sales to consumers were launched in April 1999, while volume production and sales did not begin until later in 2000. ReplayTV was purchased by SONICblue in 2001.

On March 23, 2003, SONICblue filed for Chapter 11 bankruptcy, and on April 16 sold most of its assets, including ReplayTV, to the Japanese electronics giant D&M Holdings. SONICblue was fighting a copyright infringement suit over the ReplayTV's ability to skip commercials when it filed for bankruptcy.

On December 19, 2005, Digital Networks North America announced that it was exiting the hardware business as soon as current inventory was sold out. ReplayTV would then concentrate on PC software sales of its DVR technology in a partnership with Hauppauge Computer Works, a manufacturer of television cards for PCs.

On December 13, 2007, D&M Holdings sold most of the assets of ReplayTV to DirecTV. It still provided electronic program guide service to existing customers, using content from Tribune Media Services. The domains replay.com, replaytv.com, and replaytv.net used by the ReplayTV units to access the electronic program guide are or were owned by DirecTV.

On June 15, 2011, D&M Holdings announced it was permanently discontinuing the ReplayTV electronic program guide service:

"The ReplayTV Electronic Programming Guide (EPG) Service will be permanently discontinued on July 31, 2011. After this date, owners of ReplayTV DVR units will still be able to manually record analog TV programs, but will not have the benefit of access to the interactive program guide. Effective immediately, monthly billing for the ReplayTV service to remaining customers has been suspended."

On July 29, 2011, D&M announced they would continue providing guide service. The following was appearing on the ReplayTV website:

Important Announcement. After the announced shutdown of the ReplayTV programming guide service, we have had many positive, enthusiastic comments about the ReplayTV DVR products and services. In light of this response, ReplayTV and its parent company Digital Networks North America, Inc. have decided to continue the electronic programming guide service pursuant to the terms of your service activation agreement. We thank you very much for all of your support and enthusiasm over the many years these products have been sold.

Around July 4, 2015, new guide data was not being sent to ReplayTV units. The last day of guide data was July 15. ReplayTV said they were working on the problem, although it was never fixed. It is assumed this problem is a result of the bankruptcy.

== Bankruptcy ==
On July 20, 2015, ReplayTV.com posted the following information:

Digital Networks North America, Inc. filed for chapter 7 bankruptcy relief with the United States Bankruptcy Court for the District of Delaware on July 20, 2015 and has ceased all business operations. A chapter 7 trustee will be appointed by the Bankruptcy Court to oversee the administration and liquidation of the bankruptcy estate for Digital Networks North America, Inc. Creditors will receive a notice of the bankruptcy filing by mail.

Parent company of ReplayTV, Digital Networks North America filed for Chapter 7 bankruptcy. Following the announcement, ReplayTV ended services.

== Legal battle ==
On October 31, 2001, numerous TV companies, including the three major networks, filed a lawsuit against SONICblue, which at the time marketed the ReplayTV device. They alleged that the ReplayTV 4000 series was part of an “unlawful scheme” that “attacks the fundamental economic underpinnings of free television and basic nonbroadcast services” according to the lawsuit.

The TV industry attacked ReplayTV for two reasons:

1. The machines enabled people to record television programs and then watch them without commercials via the optional "Commercial Advance" feature. This had the potential to undercut advertising revenues which the lawsuit called "the lifeblood of most television channels".
2. The machines allowed users to share programs they have recorded with others via the "Send Show" feature, which transmits digital copies of shows not only on a local network, but also over the Internet to other ReplayTV owners, thereby enabling people who had not paid for premium channels to watch premium content for free.

Both the “Commercial Advance” and the “Send Show” features were alleged to violate U.S. copyright and other federal and state laws, according to the TV industry plaintiffs, who wanted sales of the ReplayTV 4000 devices—slated for shipment on Nov. 15, 2001—stopped.

The lawsuit against SONICblue was stayed when the company filed for bankruptcy protection in March 2003. In August 2003, the ReplayTV 5500 series went on sale without the Autoskip and Send Show features though the features continued to be enabled on the earlier models.

== Operation ==
ReplayTV service is only available in the United States via its subscription program. The hardware is no longer sold and the subscription service was ended in June 2011. The subscriptions service's feature of searchable program guides will end effective July 31, 2011. After this date, owners of ReplayTV DVR units will still be able to manually record analog TV programs, but will not have the benefit of access to the interactive program guide. Older units were only able to accomplish this download via a dial-up connection. Later models were also capable of downloading program guides via the user's existing internet connection (broadband or DSL), as well as via the dialup connection.

Like other DVRs, ReplayTV allows users to record television programs. The subscription service was operated on a monthly fee or a one-time lifetime payment. Each individual unit required a separate subscription. Older units, like the 2000 and 3000 series, did not require monthly subscription fees, and those units that were still in operation and continue to receive programming data without a subscription until July 31, 2011. The price of the original ReplayTV units was higher than comparable TiVo units by approximately the same amount as TiVo's lifetime subscription, so a lifetime subscription was essentially priced into the units.

Some ReplayTV models allow automatic commercial skipping with no user intervention. It scanned for the black frames local television stations used to insert commercials.

== Hardware and features ==
The "4000 Series" and "5000 Series" ReplayTV units have Ethernet connections that allow the user to stream shows to another similar ReplayTV unit within the same local network, transfer shows to another similar ReplayTV unit (either on the local network or across the Internet) or to a personal computer. This capability enables users to move recorded programs to PCs using third-party programs. These units also have the capability to automatically skip commercial advertisements during playback (known as "Commercial Advance", which was trademarked by the original company). This commercial advance feature used several heuristics to detect commercials and had an accuracy of about 90 to 95 percent. Recording of television programs could be accomplished either manually, or through use of the program guide using various criteria. Shows to be recorded could also be described via thematic categories. Shows could be recorded or lightly managed through MyReplayTV at my.replaytv.com

The most recent "5500 Series" ReplayTV units had the ability to stream shows to another similar ReplayTV unit within the same local network, but when loaded with up-to-date system software they can no longer transfer shows to other ReplayTV units across the Internet. The "5500 Series" units have also had the automatic Commercial Advance feature removed in favor of a manual "Show|Nav" feature. The units are otherwise identical to the "5000 Series" units. System software releases prior to version 5.1 build 144 retain the original features even in 5500-series hardware devices, but the software is automatically updated to 5.1 build 144 via through-the-web software updates.

The "4000 Series", "5000 Series" and "5500 Series" ReplayTV units stored the content using MPEG2.

- Video: mpeg2video, yuv420p, 720x480, 29.97 frame/s, 7413 kbit/s
- Audio: mp2, 48000 Hz, stereo, 192 kbit/s

The operating system used on the "4000 Series", "5000 Series" and "5500 Series" was Vxworks. Several versions of the software were released. Some older versions supported Commercial Advance even on newer units.

== Other features ==
Beginning with the earliest models, ReplayTV units had an undocumented "random access skip" feature. While playing a recorded program, the user could enter a number from the remote control, then press the QuickSkip button to advance that number of minutes forward in the program, or press the "Skip Back" button to go back that number of minutes. If no number was entered, the skip buttons would advance 30 seconds or retreat ten seconds, respectively. This feature spanned several models of ReplayTV. Users could also type a number followed by pressing Jump to go to that exact minute in the recording.

== Models ==
The first models released were the 2000 series from ReplayTV (the company name at that time). In 1999, the price of the ReplayTV 2001 was $995 and it provided 6 hours of video storage. The ReplayTV model 2004 was $1,995 and provided 26 hours. Each of these models included a lifetime offer of program guide service. The ReplayTV 2020 model, offering 20 hours of recording storage, was also released in 1999 at a cost of $699. It replaced the previously released models.

In the year 2000 the 3000-series models were released, as well as an equivalent "ShowStopper" model branded by Panasonic. This was followed by the 4000 line in the fall of 2001. The 4000-series models were the first to include an Ethernet port, and to support the sharing of shows between different units either locally (using video streaming) or over the Internet (by duplicating the content).

In 2002 the 4500-series was released. These had hardware that was much like the 4000-series, but they could be purchased without lifetime program guide service for a substantially reduced price. All subsequent models also unbundled the guide service from the hardware. Units without lifetime activation become almost completely unusable if the monthly activation is terminated.

2005 products with list prices (no longer available):

- ReplayTV RTV5504 40-Hour Digital Video Recorder ($149.99)
- ReplayTV RTV5508 80-Hour Digital Video Recorder ($299.99)
- ReplayTV RTV5516 160-Hour Digital Video Recorder ($449.99)
- ReplayTV RTV5532 320-Hour Digital Video Recorder ($799.99)

The ReplayTV 5000 series included a JP1 remote which could be reprogrammed or upgraded using free software.

== Subscription ==
The ReplayTV subscription has two different options, a monthly recurring charge of $12.95, or one-time lifetime activation fee of $299. Subscriptions for additional units were $6.95 a month. PC edition customers are charged $20 per year and come with one year of service.

On June 15, 2011, ReplayTV announced that it would be permanently discontinuing its Electronic Programming Guide Service (the channel guide) on July 31, 2011. "After this day, your ReplayTV DVR will still be able to manually record analog TV programs, but will not have the benefit of access to the interactive program guide. All billing for your service has been suspended."

Their website states the reasoning as being that the industry conversion to HDTV is complete, and customers should contact their local providers for options.

However, there may be options to keep service alive after official support ends using the WiRNS application as all units should be permanently activated if they contact ReplayTV servers before July 31, 2011.

On July 29, 2011, D&M Holdings reversed their previous decision and will continue the ReplayTV electronic program guide service. "For monthly subscribers of the ReplayTV service, we are exploring options by which you may continue paying for and receiving such service going forward. We apologize in advance should there be any minor disruptions in the ReplayTV service while we implement the continuation of the programming guide. Thank you. ReplayTV"

On or around July 4, 2015, DirectTV apparently turned off their guide servers at production.replaytv.net. On July 15, 2015, the last guide data disappeared from ReplayTV units; it is doubtful that the guide data will return. However, alternatives exist which can provide ReplayTVs with guide data for as long as they (the ReplayTV units themselves) are functional. Three such options are LaHO, WiRNS and Perc Data.

== See also ==
- Commercial skipping
