= Element Electronics =

American consumer electronics company

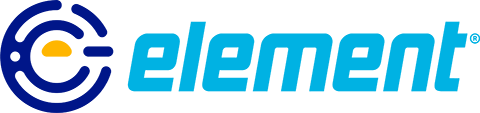
- Element Electronics logo as of November 2020
- Type: Private
- Industry: Consumer electronics
- Founded: 2007
- Headquarters: 392 US Hwy 321 Bypass South, Winnsboro, South Carolina, U.S.
- Key people: Mike O'Shaughnessy, Founder / CEO; Vlad Kazhdan, President
- Products: 4K UHD TVs, LED TVs, QLED TVs, monitors, soundbars, appliances
- Website: www.elementelectronics.com

Element Electronics is an American consumer electronics company founded in 2007 by Mike O’Shaughnessy and headquartered in Winnsboro, South Carolina, where it operates a television assembly facility. The company sells televisions, monitors, soundbars, and home appliances in the United States through national retail channels.

== History ==
Element Electronics is a private company specializing in the sale of affordable televisions, monitors, soundbars, and a diverse range of appliances. Founded in 2007, the company is headquartered in Winnsboro, South Carolina. Element Electronics has expanded its presence, with additional offices located in Minnesota, Arkansas, and Georgia.

== Manufacturing ==
In 2014, Element Electronics opened a manufacturing facility in Winnsboro, South Carolina, covering approximately 315,000 square feet and employing around 500 workers. It was at that time one of the few U.S. sites assembling mass-market televisions. This milestone marked Element Electronics as a distinctive player in the consumer electronics industry, as it became the only major television company assembling televisions in the United States.

In 2017, the company employed nearly 500 individuals across various locations in the United States.

In 2018, Element Electronics supported U.S. tariffs on imported television products, arguing they were necessary to protect domestic manufacturing. The tariffs later extended to key components imported from China, prompting the company to temporarily consider closing its assembly plant before obtaining exemptions. This led to an initial plan to close the Winnsboro plant and lay off 126 employees. However, Element Electronics was later granted a tariff exclusion and canceled its plans to close its Winsboro plant.

Element Electronics has been criticized by the Alliance for American Manufacturing for misrepresenting its actual extent of American manufacturing content, and has filed a petition with the Federal Trade Commission in 2014 over its fraudulent advertising claims.

== Campaigns ==
Heisman Trophy winner and Fox Sports analyst Matt Leinart starred in a national TV campaign for Element Electronics in the fall of 2016. The campaign included an Element-branded, on-air integration on Fox Sports called "Right Moves with Matt Leinart", featuring Leinart breaking down the best college football plays of the week. This was Element Electronics' first national TV campaign.

== Products ==
The company’s product lines have included televisions ranging in size from 19 to 86 inches compatible with various smart-platform interfaces and consumer appliances such as monitors, soundbars, and household appliances. They also offer monitors, sound bars, and major appliances: refrigerators, freezers, washers, dryers, dishwashers, ranges, microwaves, and air conditioners.

In 2020, Element Electronics expanded its product portfolio by entering the appliance market. They introduced a line of refrigerators and freezers, further diversifying their offerings.

In 2022, the company launched a noteworthy product – an Outdoor Roku TV, specifically designed to withstand various weather conditions. This product catered to outdoor entertainment enthusiasts and further solidified Element Electronics' presence in the smart TV market with the first outdoor Roku TV.

In 2023, Element Electronics formed strategic partnerships with Xumo and Google TV. This collaboration led to the introduction of the 300, 400, and 500 Series Element TVs, providing consumers with a wider range of options for their home entertainment needs.

== Reception ==
The company's television models have been independently reviewed and rated by Consumer Reports for performance and value.
