= Anthony Wood (businessman) =

American businessman (born 1965)

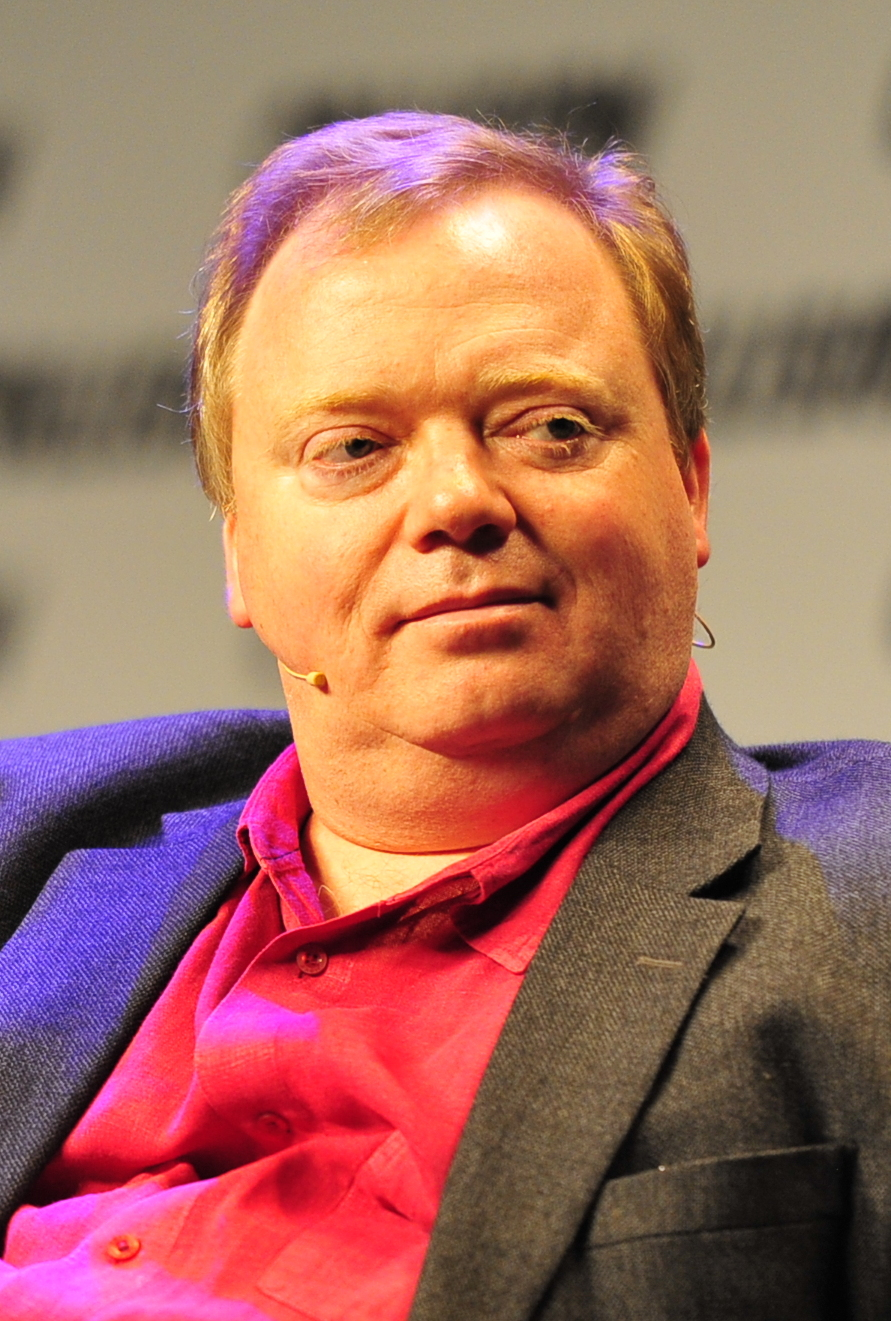
- Born: December 4, 1965 (age 60); England
- Education: Texas A&M University (BS)
- Occupation: Businessman
- Known for: Founder, Chairman and CEO of Roku, Inc.
- Spouse: Susan Wood
- Children: 3

Anthony J. Wood (born December 4, 1965) is an American businessman and philanthropist. He is the founder, chairman and CEO of Roku, Inc. In April 2021, he owned 15% stake in Roku, and had a net worth of US$7.2 billion.

== Personal life ==
Wood was born and grew up in Manchester, England, followed by the state of Georgia in the U.S. At the age of 13, he moved to the Netherlands with family, and then lived in Texas in the U.S.

In 1984, when Wood was a teenager, he published "Lunar Lander" in the Ahoy! magazine. He earned a bachelor's degree in electrical engineering from Texas A&M University. It was there that Wood met his wife, Susan, who was studying environmental design. The couple has three children, and resides in Palo Alto, California.

== Career ==
While in college, Wood founded his first company, "AW Software", to sell computer programs. He also founded "SunRize Industries" while studying engineering, developing software and hardware for the Amiga. After graduating, he founded "SunRize version 2". Later, in 1995, Wood launched another company, "iBand", which was bought by Macromedia for $36 million. Wood became the vice president of Internet Authoring at Macromedia.

Wood left Macromedia in September 1997 to launch ReplayTV, a digital video recorder (DVR) maker. Wood began working on the DVR development reportedly after being "frustrated" at missing episodes of Star Trek: The Next Generation. Features introduced by ReplayTV included ad-skipping, rewinding and pausing live television. Wood sold ReplayTV in 2001 to SONICblue Incorporated for US$42 million.

In 2002, Wood founded Roku, Inc., his sixth startup, to market home digital devices. "Roku" means “six” in Japanese. In 2007 Netflix, Inc. employed Wood as the vice president of Netflix's "Internet TV", directly under Reed Hastings. Wood continued to be the CEO of Roku in this period. At Netflix, he built a team which developed a Netflix-streaming player as well as applications allowing PC users to stream Netflix onto their computers. Netflix later spun Wood's engineering team back out to Roku.

== Philanthropy ==
In 2021, Wood and his wife, Susan, donated $48.2 million to create the "WoodNext Foundation", a Texas-based philanthropy. Its priorities include mental health, homelessness, scientific and biomedical research, disaster recovery, and economic opportunity with a focus on addressing root causes. Wood made $71 million in charitable commitments in 2022, and appeared on the Chronicle of Philanthropy's list of America's 50 biggest donors. In 2023, the WoodNext Foundation granted $14.3 million to the University of Pittsburgh for the study of heart disease and dementia, and $1.25 million to establish the BrightEdge Entrepreneurship Fellows Program through the American Cancer Society. That same year, the foundation also donated £1.9 million to the School of Ocean and Earth Science at University of Southampton to fund research in how Earth's climate has changed over the past billion years, during times when the planet experienced severe ice ages.

In January 2025, Woodnext Foundation granted over £1 million to the School of Life Sciences at the University of Dundee to support research in understanding how mutations, in particular protein kinases, cause human diseases such as amyotrophic lateral sclerosis (ALS) and ROSAH syndrome. In March 2025, Woodnext Foundation awarded the Brain & Behavior Research Foundation (BBRF) $5 million over five years to sponsor research, including that at the Yale School of Medicine, in neurobiological and behavioral science. The research areas included opioid use disorder, depression in pregnant women, schizophrenia, bipolar disorder, and the effects of psychedelics on perception and consciousness.

== Political activities ==
Wood has contributed significant sums to conservative political efforts. In March 2025, Wood individually contributed $1 million to the super PAC Texans for a Conservative Majority. In addition, his combined contributions to Texans for Senator John Cornyn Inc., Alamo PAC, and Cornyn Victory Committee amount to $22,400 in 2024 and 2025. Together with Texans for a Conservative Majority, these PACs are joint fundraising participants supporting the re-election of Texas Republican representative John Cornyn to the U.S. Senate in 2026. In October 2024, Wood individually contributed $100,000 to the super PAC AFC Victory Fund. The AFC Victory Fund supports the American Federation for Children (once called "Advocates for School Choice") which is a 501(c)(4) organization that promotes school choice programs. In August 2022, Wood individually contributed $200,000 to Take Back the House 2022, a joint fundraising committee created to gain a Republican majority in the U.S. House of Representatives during the 2022 United States elections.
