= Roku City =

Screensaver for Roku

A screenshot of the screensaver

Roku City is the name given to the default screensaver present on Roku streaming devices. The looping background depicts a virtual metropolis at night, colored by hues of magenta and blue. It contains Easter eggs and references to Hollywood movies, and has been recognized for its use of such references. The screensaver began to have advertising in May 2023.

== Overview ==
The screensaver depicts a slowly looping city street in the foreground, composed of businesses, a diner, a movie theater, and a city hall. Across a body of water in the background, there are silhouettes of buildings, volcanoes, a spaceship, a robot monster, and more. The complementary color scheme is prominently composed of pink and purple hues. The scene changes with the seasons; in the autumn months, trees change colors. The illustration contains easter eggs of various films and characters, including King Kong and The Wizard of Oz.

The illustrations were created by Kyle Jones, a freelance graphic artist, who took inspiration from Art Deco architecture to design the city. The name of the background known internally at Roku was City Stroll: Movie Magic, and it debuted in 2018.

In December 2024, Roku City received its biggest update so far, in which the screensaver was updated from HD (720p) to FHD (1080p), a star button was added to billboards across the city to allow viewers to easily learn more about the program being advertised, and new Easter eggs and the Roku City train station were added to the city.

== Easter eggs ==
Roku City is filled with hidden Easter eggs and homages to famous Hollywood movies and TV shows, and more recently, pop culture and social media trends, creating what has been described as a "Where's Waldo?" for the streaming era and inspiring a "new kind of fandom" (in 2022, Roku's internal tracking data showed that Roku City was mentioned once every eleven minutes on Twitter, as reported by The New York Times). Many outlets have covered the popularity of Roku City and how it is fueled by the screensaver's Easter eggs. As one journalist put it, "Roku fans love its screensaver that shows Roku City full of hidden references to movies and TV shows." Another stressed how Roku City is "updated periodically with the latest hits and Easter eggs to delight fans." Domenic DiMeglio, the executive vice president and chief marketing officer for Paramount Streaming expressed similar thoughts when announcing a new limited-time Paramount neighborhood in Roku City, stating that "[f]ans are always looking for those Easter eggs." Dolly Parton, following her death, was added to the Roku City screensaver on the electronic billboard showcasing her guitar and butterflies surrounding it

Below is a non-exhaustive list of films and shows referenced in Roku City as of July 2024:

Referenced media	Easter egg details		
Referenced media	Easter egg details	101 Dalmatians	Cruella De Vil's car can be seen driving across the foreground with a Dalmatian dog sticking its head out the window.
Back to the Future	The Hill Valley Courthouse is visible in the foreground with Marty McFly's hoverboard on the steps.		
Cars	Ramone can be seen driving across the foreground.		
Cast Away	An island with a ball on it is visible in the water, referencing Wilson the volleyball from the film.		
A Christmas Story	A leg lamp can be seen through a window.		
Ghostbusters	The firehouse featured as the Ghostbusters' base of operations is pictured in the foreground.		
The Graduate	The silhouette of a woman's leg extended in front of a standing man can be seen in the windows of one of the buildings, referencing the film's poster shot.		
Jaws	A shark fin is seen sticking out of the water following a boat.		
Singin' in the Rain	A lamp post is pictured with an umbrella next to it.		
Star Wars	The Death Star can be seen floating in the sky in the background.		
Superman	The Daily Planet building can be seen in the background.		
The Wizard of Oz	The Emerald City can be seen in the background.		
Ferris Bueller's Day Off	The Ferrari 250 GT California Spyder from the movie can be seen jacked up in front of the movie theater.		
Rear Window	A silhouette of James Stewart's character with binoculars pointed toward the viewer.		
Squid Game	A van with symbols used in the television show appears driving along the street.		

== Advertising ==
It slowly began adding advertising to the city through branded partnerships in 2023, including with McDonald's, Paramount+, and Disney. These partnerships usually add a new branded building or a new billboard to the city. In some instances, they have changed pre-existing buildings to include the branding. Roku built a real life, pop-up display of Roku City for the 2023 SXSW festival.

== Reception ==
As Roku became a popular player in the streaming space, the ubiquity of Roku City gave rise to semi-ironic fascination among users, and it became the focus of memes. Olivia Craighead of Gawker wrote: "Roku City haunts me. What would it be like to live in such a place, where there is peace in one borough while just a river away there is mass hysteria and a giant robot is terrorizing the masses." Roku's internal team observed an uptick in attention at the onset of the COVID-19 pandemic, when most people stayed home and nightlife was nonexistent.

Its widespread usage has been considered unprecedented. Luke Winkie at The New York Times wrote: "Roku has become the unlikely venue for a massive public art experiment. Due to the size of the company’s customer base, countless homes peer into Roku City every weeknight."
