= Langen am Arlberg railway station =

Railway station in Vorarlberg, Austria

Langen am Arlberg
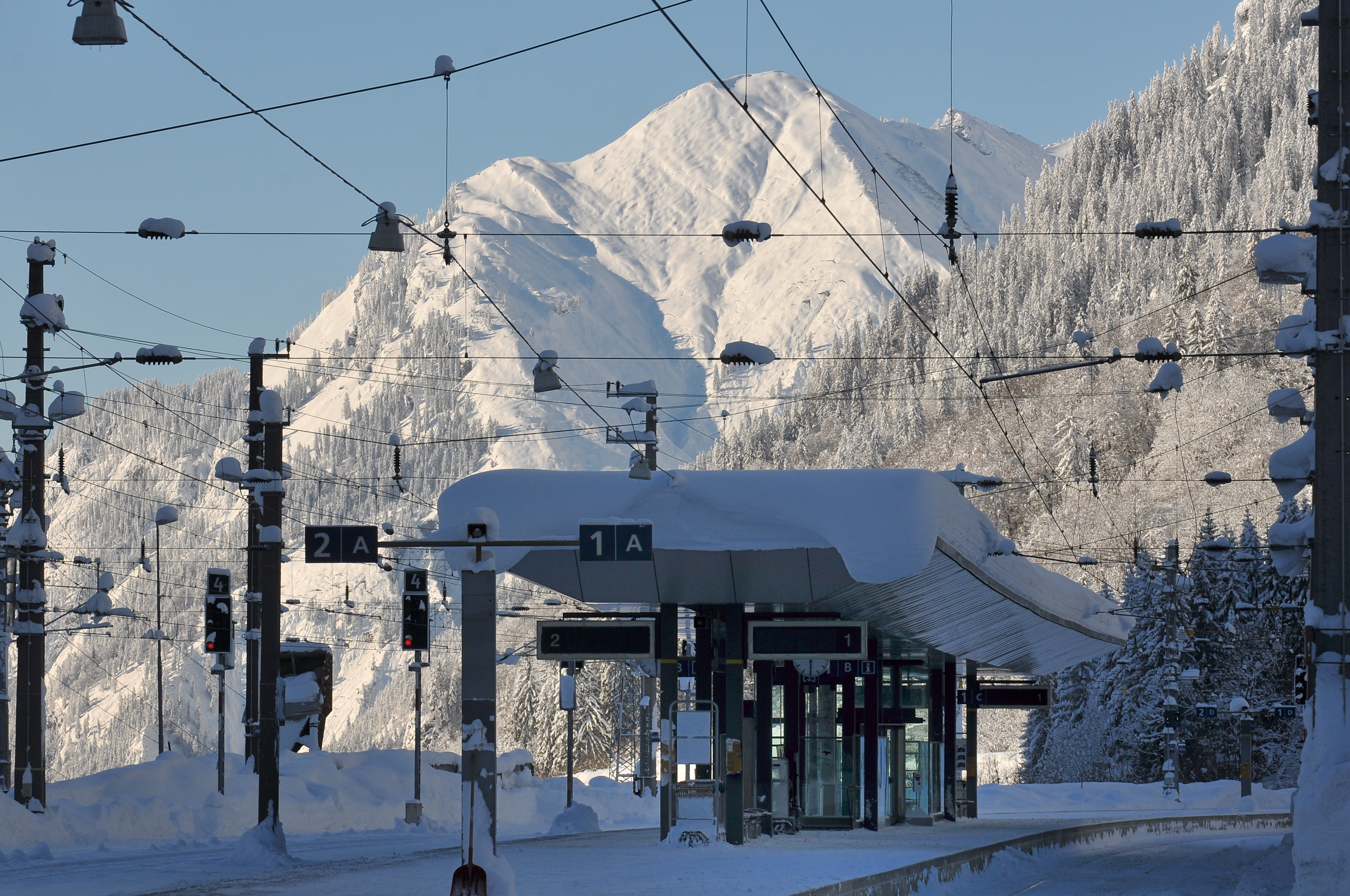

General information
- Location: Langen am Arlberg 18; 6754 Langen am Arlberg; Austria
- Coordinates: 47°07′54.3288″N 10°07′16.9968″E
- Elevation: 1,217 m (AA) (3709 ft)
- Line: Arlberg Railway
- Train operators: ÖBB

Services
Preceding station	ÖBB	Following station
Bludenz towards Bregenz	Railjet Express	St. Anton am Arlberg towards Vienna Airport
Bludenz towards Bregenz	Railjet	St. Anton am Arlberg towards Innsbruck Hbf
Bludenz towards Bregenz	Nightjet	St. Anton am Arlberg towards Wien Hbf
Bludenz towards Zürich HB	Nightjet	St. Anton am Arlberg towards Graz Hbf
Preceding station	DB Fernverkehr	Following station
Bludenz towards Dortmund Hbf	ICE 62 Bodensee	St. Anton am Arlberg towards Innsbruck Hbf
Location
- Location within Austria Location within Vorarlberg

Langen am Arlberg railway station (German: Bahnhof Langen am Arlberg) is a railway station in the village of Langen am Arlberg in the Klostertal (Bludenz district) in the westernmost Austrian state of Vorarlberg. It is located on the Arlberg railway line between Innsbruck and Bludenz, near the western portal of the Arlberg Tunnel.

The six railway stations between Langen am Arlberg and Bludenz (Klösterle, Wald am Arlberg, Dalaas, Hintergasse, Braz, Bings) are defunct.

== Services ==
=== Rail services ===
Langen am Arlberg provides long-distance connections only, since regional traffic on the Arlberg mountain section was abandoned completely.

It is serviced by:

- ÖBB-EuroCity: Vienna/Graz–Innsbruck–Feldkirch–Bregenz/Zürich (CH)
- Nightjet: Vienna/Graz–Innsbruck–Feldkirch–Bregenz/Zürich (CH)
- InterCity: Innsbruck–Dortmund (D)
- WESTbahn: Bregenz–Wien Westbahnhof

=== Bus services ===
There are coach lines serving Langen am Arlberg railway station: Line 720 from Bludenz via Langen railway station to Stuben, and Line 750 from Langen railway station to Lech.

== See also ==
- Arlberg
- Flexenbahn
