= Wald am Arlberg railway station =

Defunct railway station in Vorarlberg, Austria

Wald am Arlberg
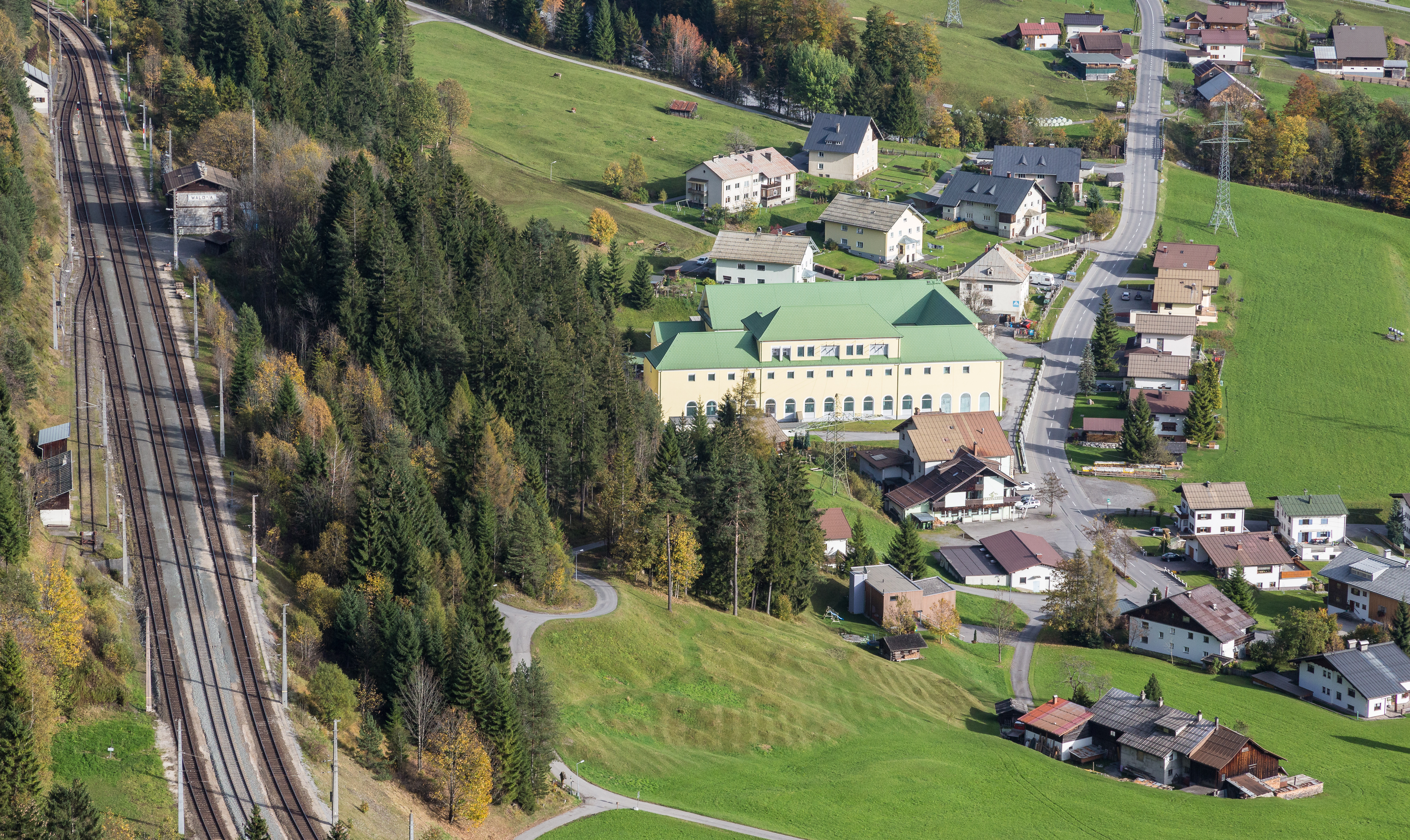
- Aerial view of the former station in 2014

General information
- Location: Bahnhofweg 129; 6752 Dalaas; Austria
- Coordinates: 47°08′2.5512″N 10°03′13.2768″E
- Elevation: 1,074 m (AA)
- Owner: Austrian Federal Railways (ÖBB)
- Line: Arlberg Railway

History
- Closed: May 1999
Location
- Location within Austria

Wald am Arlberg railway station (German: Bahnhof Wald am Arlberg), formerly Dannöfen railway station, was a railway station in the municipality of Dalaas (Bludenz District) in the westernmost Austrian state of Vorarlberg.

== Description ==
The station is located in the Klostertal on the western slope of the Arlberg Railway line between Innerbraz and Klösterle.

It was closed for passenger train services in May 1999 together with other stations between Bludenz and Langen am Arlberg. The next station to the west used to be Dalaas, and to the east it is Langen am Arlberg (it used to be Klösterle until the construction of the Blisadona Tunnel).

== See also ==
- Arlberg Railway Tunnel
- Arlberg
