= Alfenz =

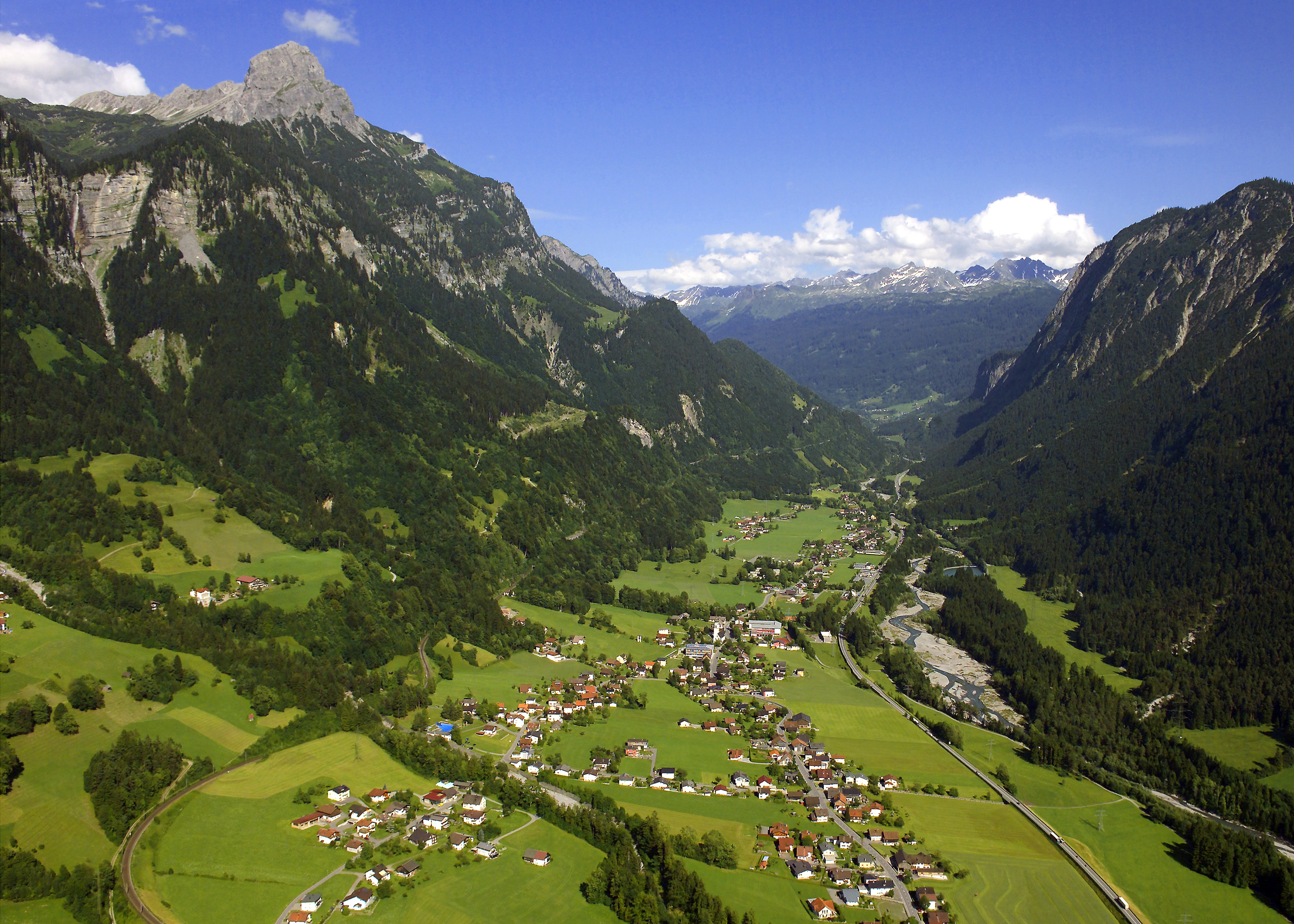
- The Alfenz is the main river of the valley Klostertal. It separates the Northern Limestone Alps (left/north) from the Silvretta Crystalline (right/south).

Location
- Country: Austria
- State: Vorarlberg

Physical characteristics
- Source
  - location: confluence of Flexenbach and Rauzbach near Stuben
  - coordinates: 47.1375°N 10.1563°E
  - elevation: 2,640 m (8,660 ft)
- Mouth
  - location: Ill
  - coordinates: 47.1349°N 9.8370°E
- Length: ~ 26 km (16 mi)

Basin features
- Progression: Ill→ Rhine→ North Sea

The Alfenz is a river of Vorarlberg, Austria.

The Alfenz is approximately 26 kilometres (16 mi) long and the main river in the valley Klostertal. It originates from the confluence of the Flexenbach and the Rauzbach near Stuben. and flows in western direction. The river's flow created the Klostertal. The Alfenz flows into the Ill 3.5 km (2.2 mi) east of Bludenz.

Villages near the river include Klösterle and Dalaas. The S16 expressway (Arlberg Schnellstraße) runs alongside the river.

The origin of the Alfenz is close to the European watershed. The Alfenz belongs to the Rhine basin, while across the Arlberg to the east the water flows into the Danube. The Alfenz carries rocks from the Northern Limestone Alps that crop out north of the river and the Silvretta Crystalline which crops out in the south.
