= Ski Arlberg =

Ski area in Austria

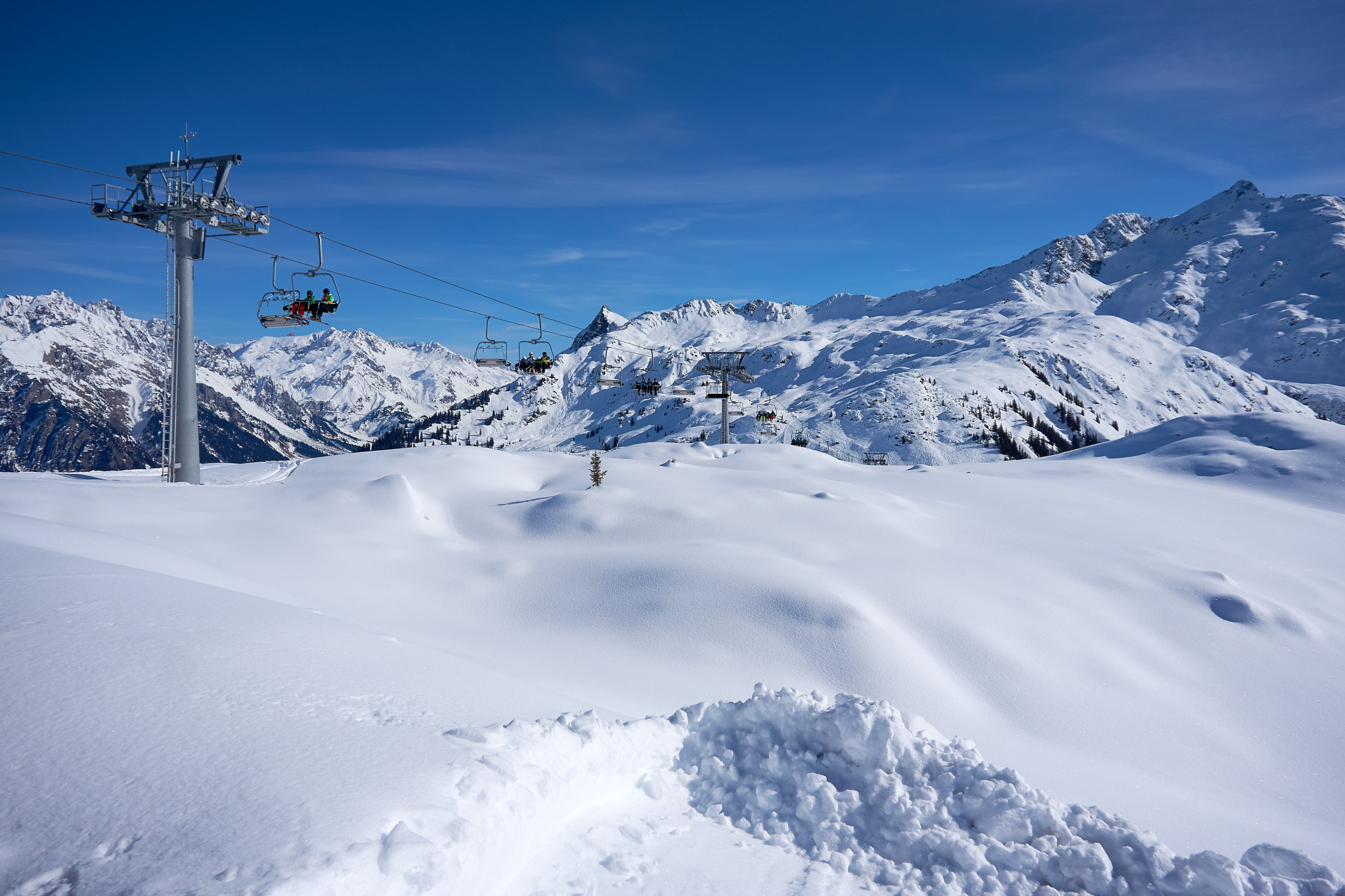
- Interactive map of Ski Arlberg
- Location: Vorarlberg, Tyrol (Austria)
- Nearest city: St. Anton am Arlberg, St. Christoph am Arlberg, Stuben am Arlberg, Lech am Arlberg, Zürs am Arlberg
- Coordinates: 47°9′27″N 10°12′47″E
- Top elevation: 2,811 m (9,222 ft)
- Base elevation: 1,269 m (4,163 ft)
- Skiable area: >300km of prepared pistes >200km of unprepared back country for freeriders
- Lift system: 85 lifts
- Website: https://www.skiarlberg.at/en

The Ski Arlberg ski area is situated in the Arlberg massif in the states of Vorarlberg and Tyrol (Austria).

Since the winter of 2013–14, the villages of Lech, Oberlech, Zürs and Zug have been linked to the Warth-Schröcken ski area which makes Ski Arlberg the largest connected ski area in Austria.

== Geography ==
Since 2013, the ski resort includes the villages of Klösterle, Lech, Oberlech, Schröcken, St. Anton am Arlberg, St. Christoph am Arlberg, Stuben, Stubenbach, Warth, Zürs and Zug.

The ski area consists of two parts, namely:

- Arlberg Ost/East (St. Anton, St. Christoph and Stuben)
- Arlberg West (Lech, Oberlech, Warth, Schröcken and Zürs)

The highest elevation of the ski area is the top of the Valluga mountain at 2,811 m above sea level in St. Anton.

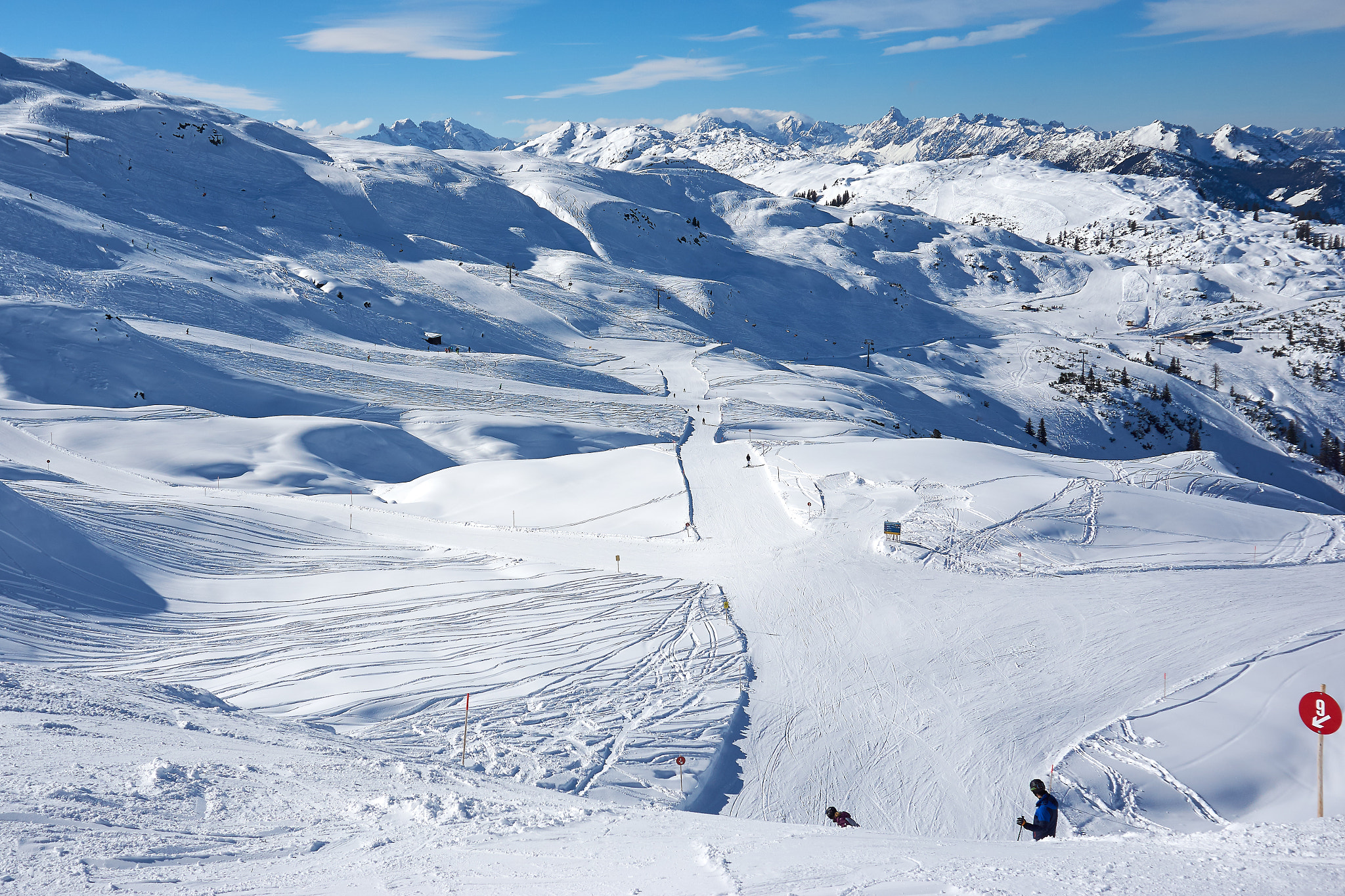
View from the Sonnenkopf (Klostertal)

== History ==
In 1884, Emperor Franz Joseph I opened the Arlberg Railway, opening up the Arlberg region to visitors. The Arlberg Ski Club was founded in 1901 and the first race took place in 1904, before there were any lifts or prepared slopes. In 1921 the first ski school was founded in Arlberg. Later, in 1931, the first of several films, Der Weiße Rausch, directed by Arnold Fanck, was made. In 1937, Austria's first tow lift and the first gondola lift went into operation in Zürs. n 1983, Michael Manhart invented the Arlberg Jet, a snowmaking machine used exclusively at the 1988 Winter Olympics in Calgary.

Since the 2013/14 season, Lech has been connected to Schröcken by the 10-person Auenfeldjet gondola, making Ski Arlberg the largest connected ski area in Austria and one of the five largest in the world. For the 2016/17 season, the 10-person Flexenbahn gondola lift opened between the Arlberg East and West areas.

== Lift system ==
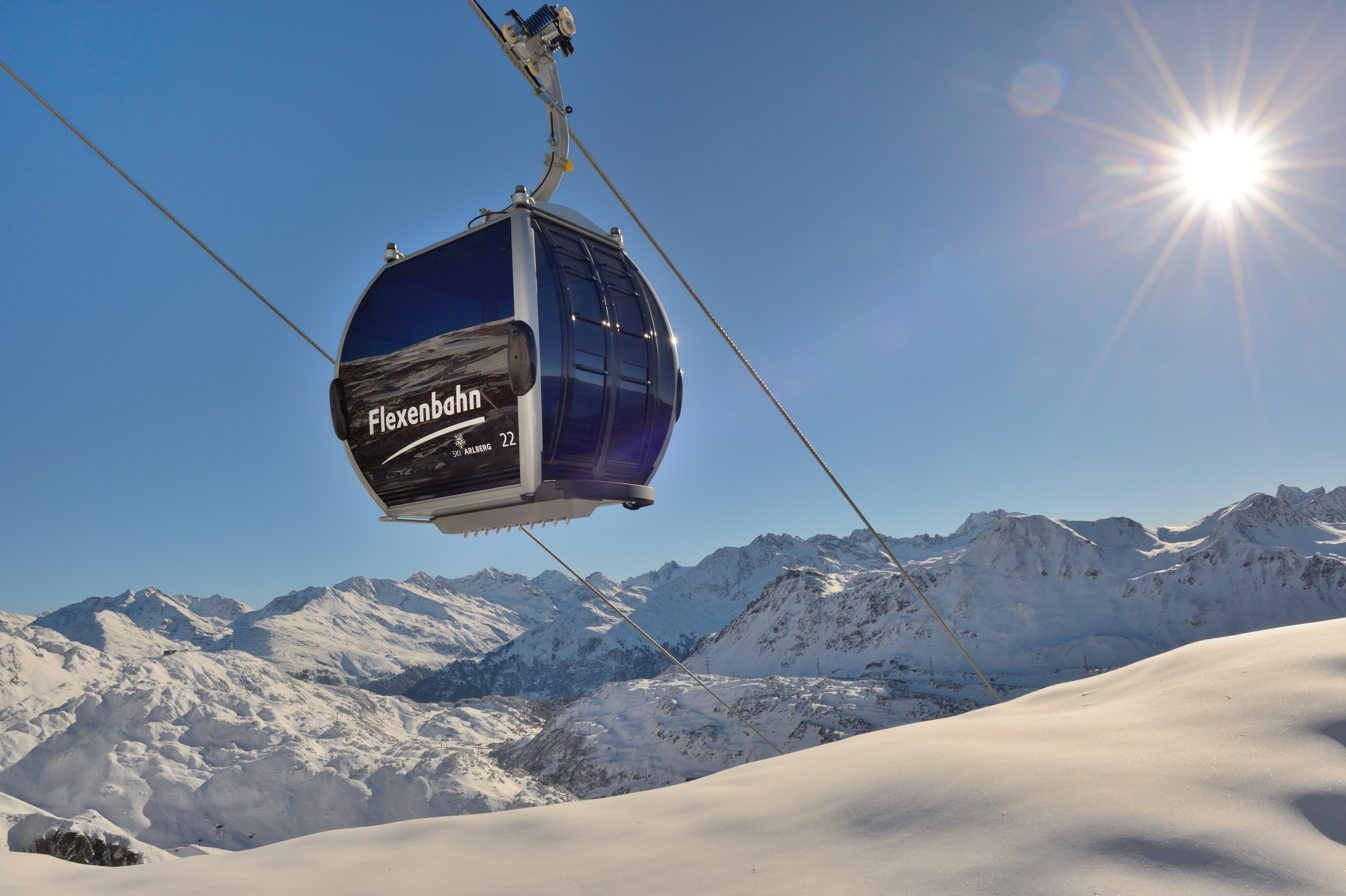
The Flexenbahn gondola

The ski area has a rich lift system consisting of a variety of aerial and surface lifts including 17 cable cars (cable cars, gondolas and funitels), 43 chairlifts (13 2-person lifts, 13 4-person lifts, 16 6-person and one 8-person lift) as well as 28 drag lifts. A remarkable lift is the Weibermahd which is a combination lift, meaning that 8-person chairlifts and 10-person gondolas alternate on the same rope. It is the first combination lift installed in Vorarlberg and was manufactured by the Austrian-Swiss company Doppelmayr.

== The White Ring ==
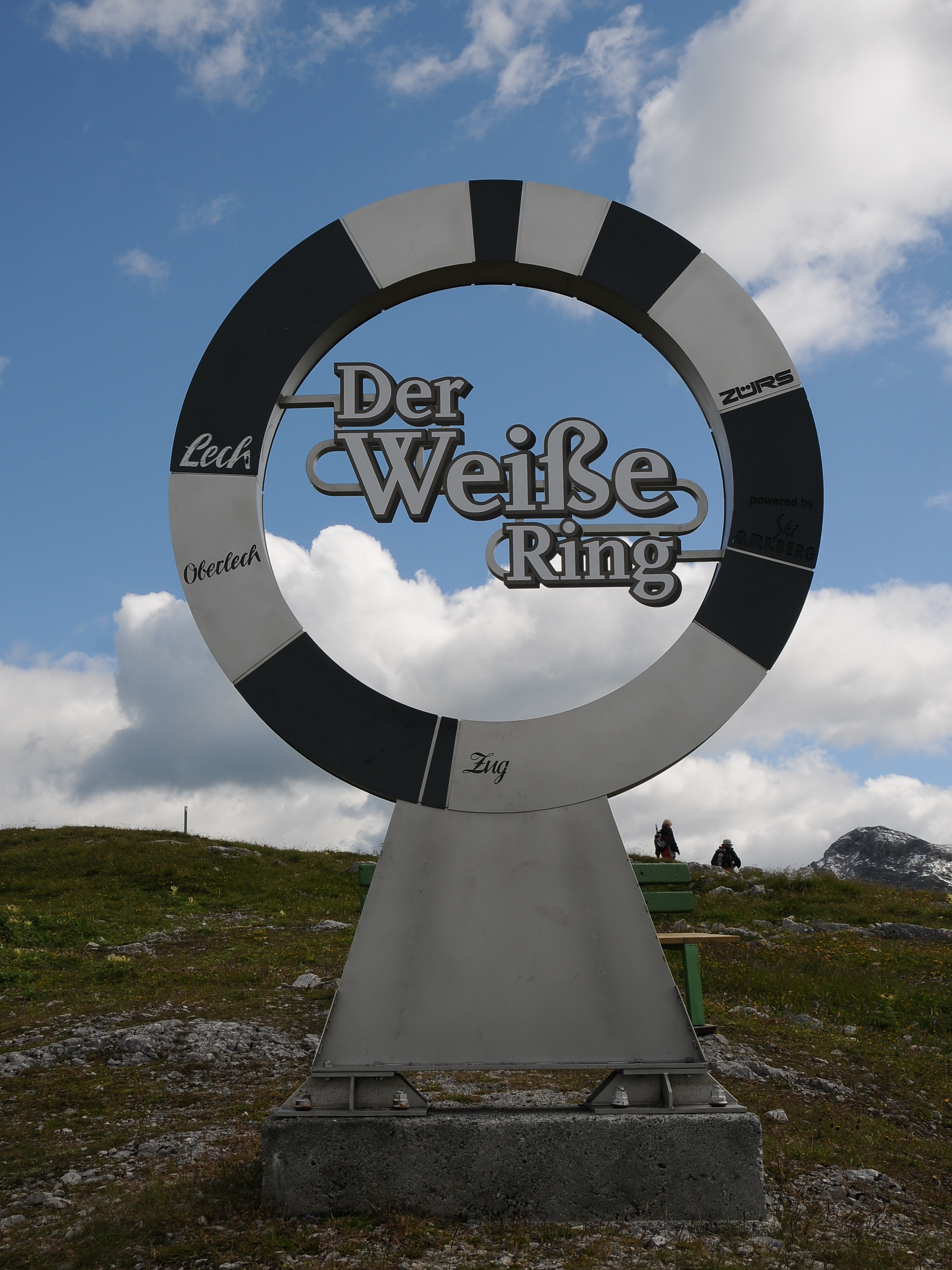
The famous "Der Weiße Ring" sign is located at the mountain station of the Rüfikopfbahn.

The White Ring (German: Der Weiße Ring) is one of the longest ski circuits in the world (22 km). It comprises five downhill runs, five ropeways, an intensive ascent and a backcountry ski run and 5,500 metres of altitude difference.

For the 50th anniversary of the ski circuit, the first White Ring ski race was held in the 2005–06 season. The course record is 44:10:75 minutes and held since 2010 by Markus Weiskopf.

== FIS Alpine Ski World Cup ==
The Ski Arlberg ski resort has been the venue for numerous World Cup ski races in the past, including the following:

- January 1988: super-G (women), winner: Zoe Haas (SUI)
- November 1991: 2 slalom races (women), winners: Vreni Schneider (SUI) and Bianca Fernández Ochoa (SPA)
- January 1993: slalom (men), winner: Thomas Fogdö (SWE)
- January 1993: combination (men), winner: Marc Girardelli (LUX)
- December 1993: super-G (men), winner: Hannes Trinkl (AUT)
- December 1994: 2 slalom races (men), winner (both): Alberto Tomba (IT)
- February 2004: downhill (men), winner: Hermann Maier (AUT)
- January 2021: downhill (women), winner: Sofia Goggia (ITA)

super G (women), winner: Lara Gut-Behrami (SUI)

- January 2023: super-G (women), winner: Federica Brignone (ITA), Lara Gut-Behrami (SUI)

In 2020, the Audi FIS Ski World Cup was postponed to 26 and 27 November due to a lack of snow and high temperatures on the original dates of November 14 and 15.
