= Klostertal =

Valley in Vorarlberg, Austria

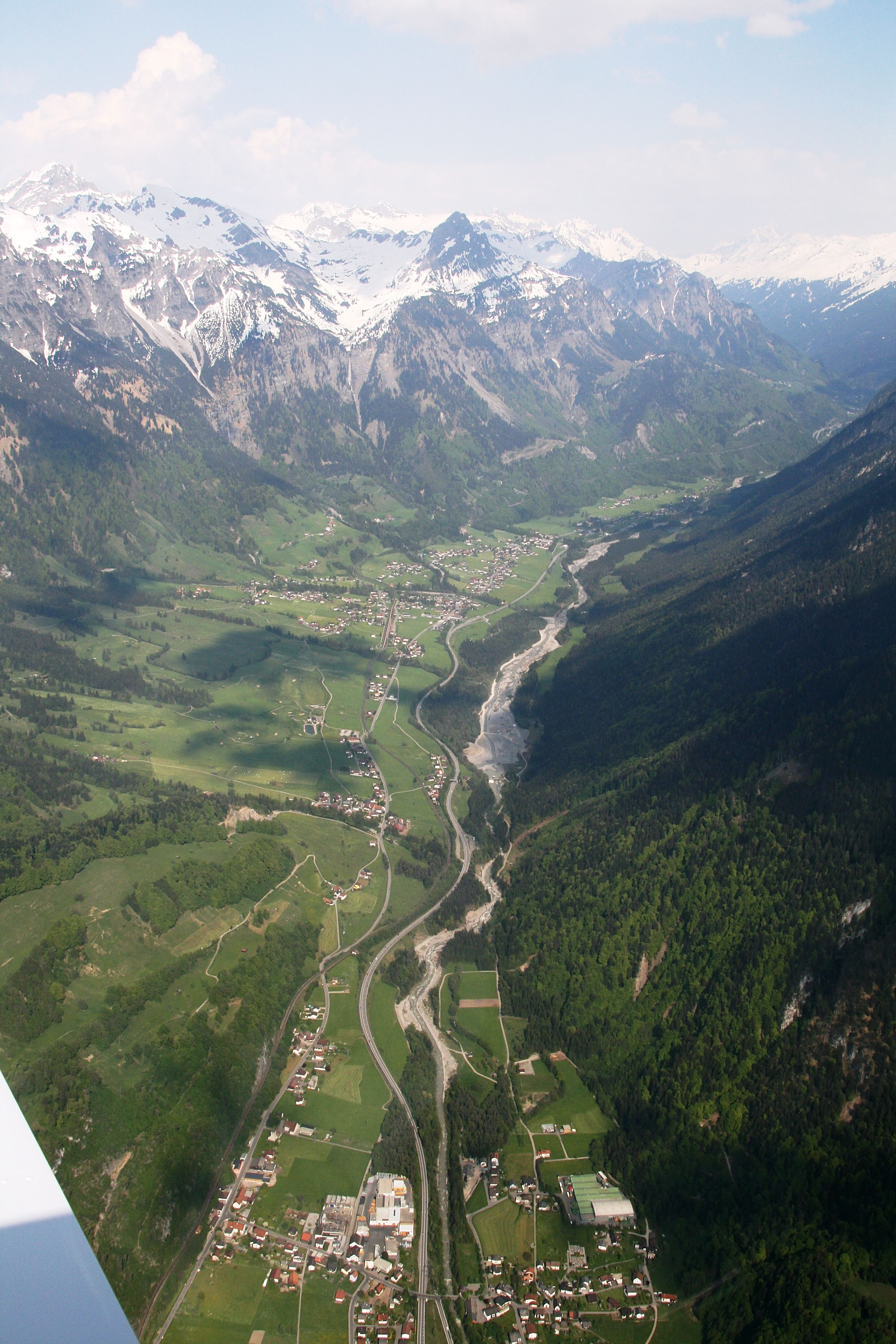
- Klostertal seen from west
- Floor elevation: 587–1,793 m (1,926–5,883 ft)
- Length: 30 km (19 mi)

Geography
- Location: Vorarlberg, Austria
- Coordinates: 47.125°N 10.000°E
- Rivers: Alfenz
- Interactive map of Klostertal

The Klostertal, lit. 'Cloister Valley', is an alpine valley in Vorarlberg, in Austria. It branches off at Bludenz and extends about 30 km (19 mi) to the east to the Arlberg and the border with Tyrol. It consists of the three communities of Klösterle am Arlberg, Dalaas and Innerbraz and the three Bludenz towns Bings, Radin and Außerbraz with an area of 193.6 km^{2} (74.7 sq mi) and about 4,700 inhabitants (as of 2017).

The valley opens to the east of the district capital Bludenz and is characterized by the south and north steeply towering mountain ranges of the Lechquellen Mountains and the Verwalls mountain range. The Alfenz flows through the Klostertal from Stuben am Arlberg (district of Klösterle/Arlberg) to the Ill at Bludenz. The bottom of the valley is rising steadily, which is reflected by the fact that the sea level of the settlement areas ranges between 600 m (2,000 ft) in the west and 1,400 m (4,600 ft) in the east.

== History ==
The name Klostertal can be explained historically with the transfer of the chapel in St. Marienthal by Count Hugo I. von Montfort in 1218 to the Johanniterhaus in Feldkirch. In return for the foundation received, the Order of St. John had to give at least shelter, fire and water to the passing poor people. For this purpose, a hospice was built, which was called Klösterle, just like the evolving town around the hospice. Later the whole valley was called Klostertal, which replaced the former name St. Marienthal.

The shortest connection between Tyrol and Vorarlberg leads over the 1,793 m (5,883 ft) high Arlberg Pass. Over the centuries, this connection has been used by business, military and other travelers. The weather determined the length of this crossing and so along the route a number of utilities such as guest houses and accommodations were built.

In 1884, the Arlberg railway line opened, which runs through the valley between Bludenz and the Arlberg Tunnel, continuing eastwards to Innsbruck. The line was used, most prominently, by the Orient Express, and is currently used by long-distance trains (e.g. Railjet, EuroCity). Langen am Arlberg is the only railway station between Bludenz and the Arlberg Tunnel that is served by passenger trains. All other stations (Braz, Hintergasse, Dalaas, Wald am Arlberg, Klösterle) are now defunct.
