= Flexen Pass =

High mountain pass in the Austrian Alps

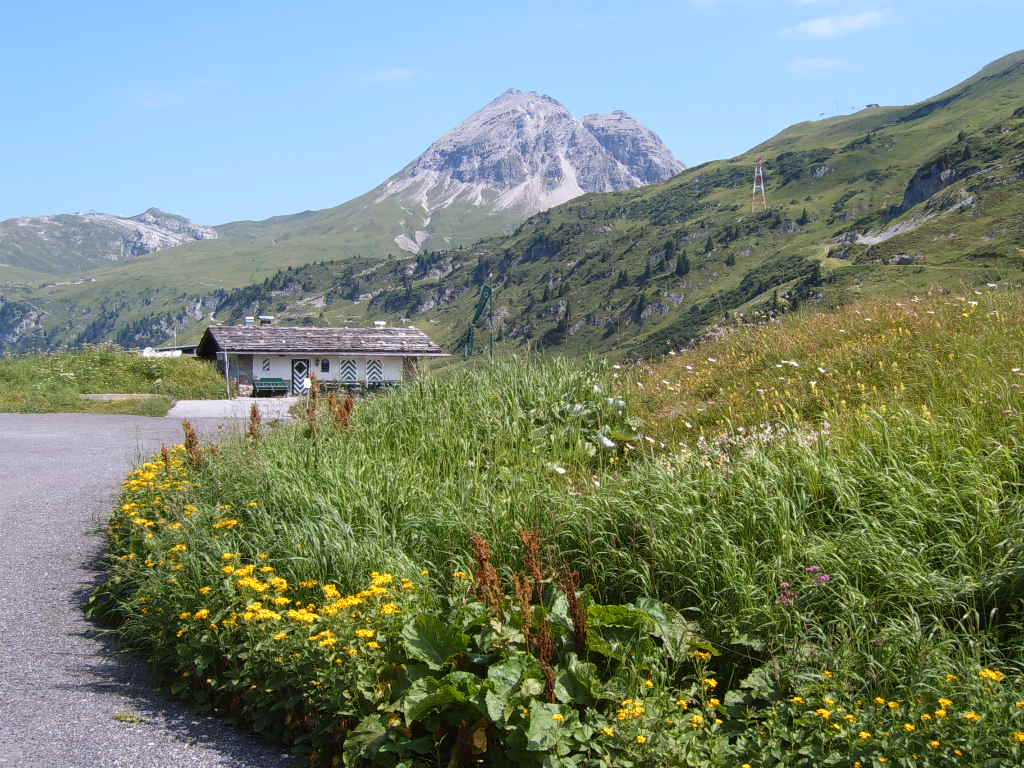
- Flexenpass with Flexen-Häusl

- Location within Alps
- Elevation: 1,773 metres (5,817 ft)
- Traversed by: B198

Third Approach
- Location: Austria
- Range: Alps
- Coordinates: 47°9′31″N 10°9′54″E

Flexen Pass is a high mountain pass in the Austrian Alps in the Bundesland of Vorarlberg. It is at an elevation of 1,773 metres (5,817 ft).

It connects the upper Lech valley between Warth, Lech, and Zürs with the Klostertal near Stuben.

The pass road was built in 1940 and leads to the road over the Arlberg pass. It became a necessity when the Arlberg railroad was opened in 1884. Before that, traffic mostly went over the Tannberg by way of Oberstdorf.

The first stretch of road was opened in October 1897 up to the pass. At first, the road was shielded from the danger of avalanche by protective covers, but eventually a tunnel was built, and then a bridge over the Hölltobel. The road was only 3 metres (10 ft) wide. In 1909 the road was finished into the Lech Valley in Tyrol. Since 1936 the pass has been open in winter. Since 1948, funds from the Marshall Plan have been utilized to improve the road and make it safer from avalanches.

In 2000, plans were unveiled for a tunnel from Stuben to Zürs. However, the plans were tabled for lack of funds.

== See also ==
- List of highest paved roads in Europe
- List of mountain passes
