= Arlberg railway =

Railway line in Austria

Arlberg Railway
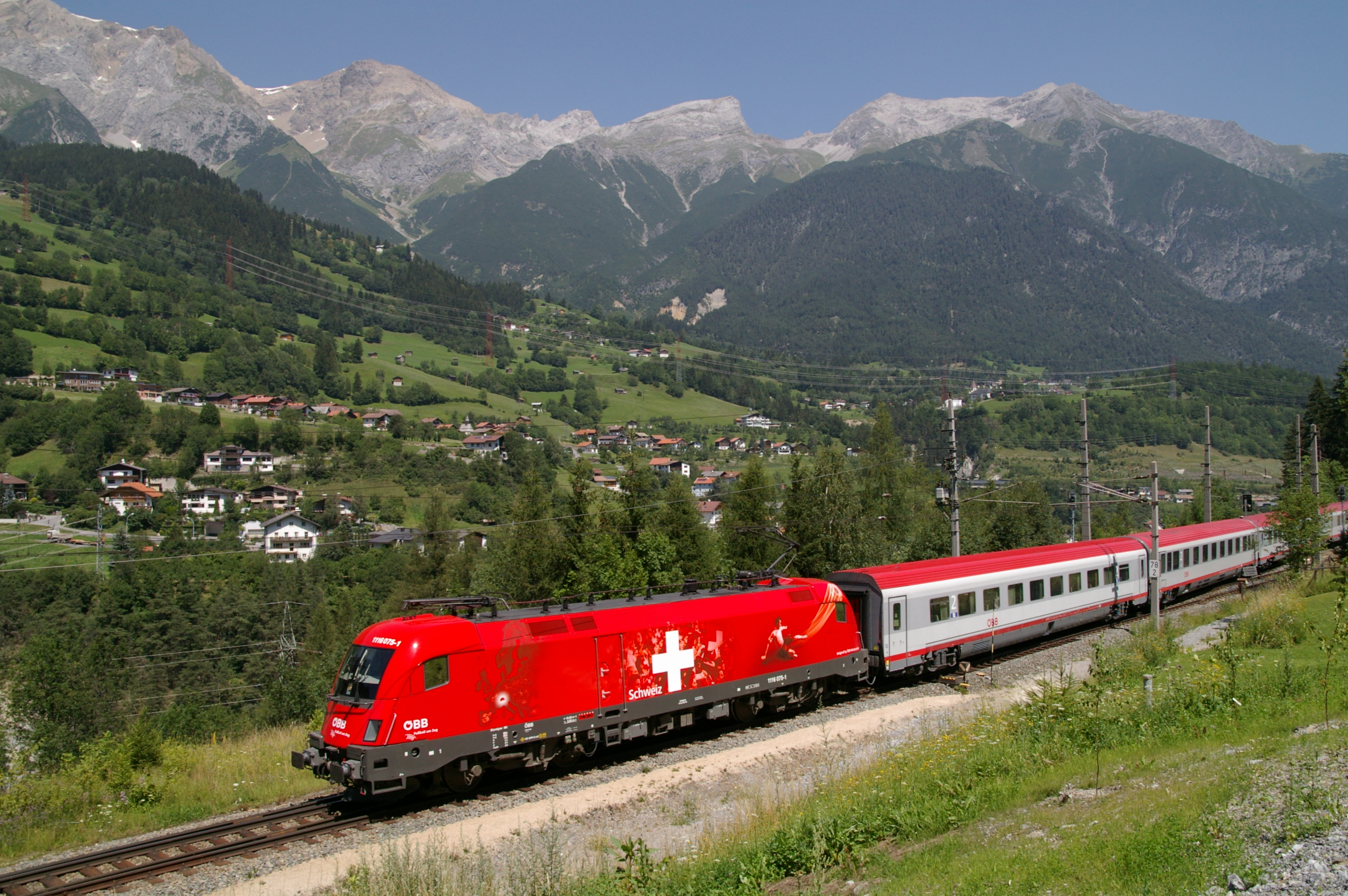
- An ÖBB train on the Arlberg Railway in 2007 near Pians village west of Landeck

Overview
- Native name: Arlbergbahn
- Status: Operational
- Owner: Austrian Federal Railways
- Line number: 101 05
- Locale: Tyrol; Vorarlberg
- Termini: Innsbruck; Bludenz
- Stations: 31

Service
- Type: Heavy rail, Passenger/Freight rail Intercity rail, Regional rail, Commuter rail
- Route number: 400
- Operator: Austrian Federal Railways

History
- Opened: Stages between 1883 and 1884

Technical
- Line length: 136.7 km (84.9 mi)
- Number of tracks: Double track (Innsbruck–Ötztal, Abzw Schönwies 1–Landeck-Zams, Abzw Flirsch 1–Abzw Langen 1); Single track
- Track gauge: 1,435 mm (4 ft 8 1/2 in) standard gauge
- Minimum radius: East ramp: 300 m West ramp: 242 m
- Electrification: 15 kV/16,7 Hz AC Overhead line
- Operating speed: 160 km/h (99 mph)
- Maximum incline: East ramp: 2.6 % West ramp: 3.4 %
Route map
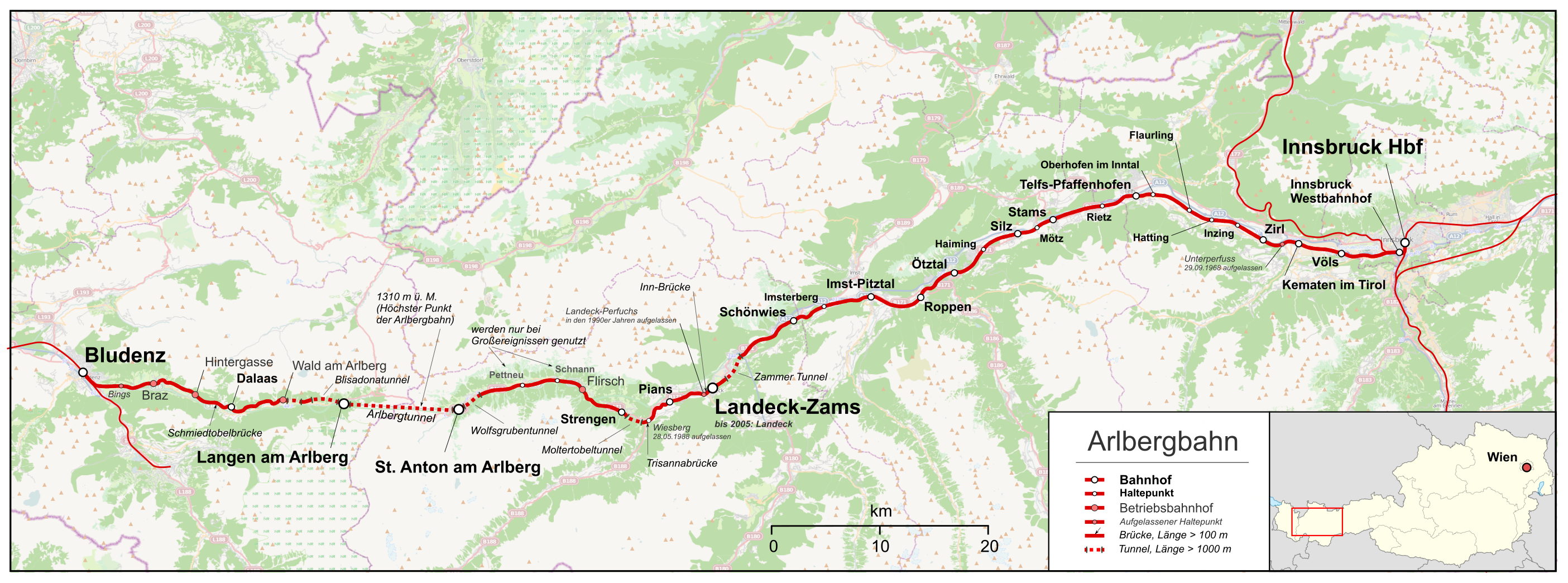

The Arlberg Railway (German: Arlbergbahn), which connects the Austrian cities Innsbruck and Bludenz, is Austria's only east-west mountain railway. It is one of the highest standard gauge railways in Europe and the second highest in Austria, after the Brenner. The 136.7 km line is a highly problematic mountain railway, in part because it is threatened by avalanches, mudslides, rockfalls and floods. It is operated by the Austrian Federal Railways (ÖBB) and frequented by international trains, including the Orient Express.

== History and construction ==
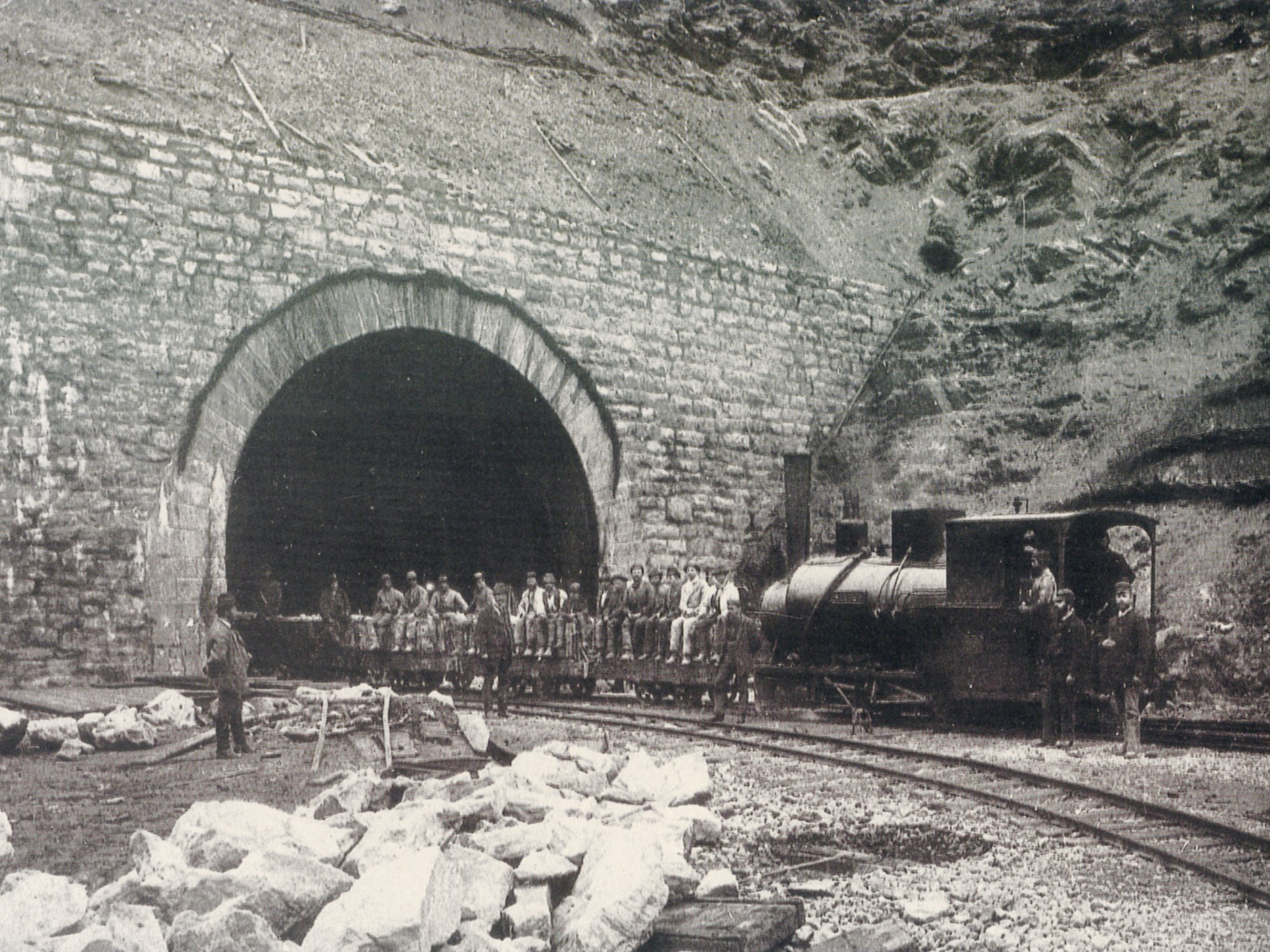
Arlberg railway tunnel construction (Western mouth)

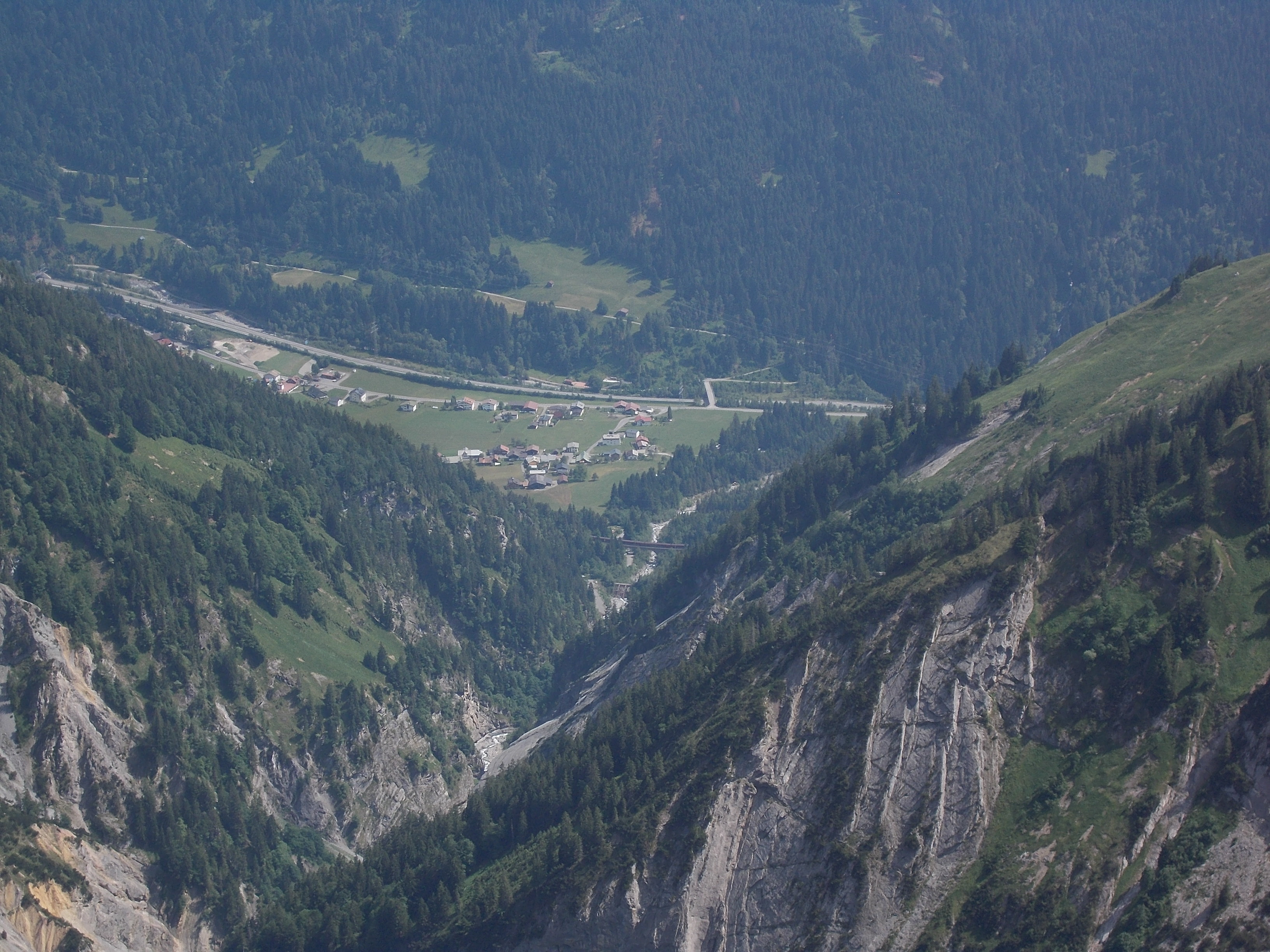
Difficult terrain: The Radona canyon in Dalaas with bridge for the arlberg railway

As early as 1842 a railway over the Arlberg Pass was under discussion, as the British sought a rail connection for traffic from England to Egypt. Two years later, in 1847, Carl Ganahl - a textile industrialist from Feldkirch - decided to privately support construction of the railway, despite the many technical challenges involved. On the other hand, the opening of the Semmering Railway in 1854 showed that mountain railways were basically possible and feasible. Trade Minister Anton Freiherr von Banhans presented on March 22, 1872, at the Chamber of Deputies a draft law on the execution of the Arlberg railway at government expense for a total amount of 42 million florins. In 1879 the protagonists of the Arlbergbahn with the intended 10,216 m long summit tunnel were successful. The submitted project had won confidence by the progress in the Gotthard Tunnel. Julius Lott was appointed planning director of the Arlbergbahn.

The construction of the Arlberg Railway started on June 20, 1880, and proceeded at a faster pace than planned. Completion was originally not expected until the autumn of 1885, but already by May 29, 1883, the valley route from Innsbruck to Landeck in Tyrol was put into service. On September 21, 1884, the entire stretch of the mountain railway was completed, including the then single-track, 10.22 kilometres (6.35 miles) long Arlbergtunnel. The construction claimed 92 lives. The costs were totaled 38,165,282 crowns. The Arlberg tunnel rises from St. Anton on a length of approximately 4 km with 2 ‰. The highest point is at 1310.926 m in kilometer 104.241 m. Then it falls to Langen am Arlberg at 15 ‰.

== Operation ==
The transalpine Arlberg Railway opened up a completely new connection between Lake Constance and the Adriatic Sea. Traffic increased so rapidly that already by July 15, 1885, a second track through the tunnel was opened, as had been planned since the beginning of the project. The most renowned train on the Arlberg route was the Orient Express, from London to Bucharest, which had only first-class compartments and parlors.

Right from the beginning, the use of steam locomotives on the Arlberg led to serious problems: Passengers and crews were exposed to the unhealthy effects of sulfurous acid, which condensed from the steam in the tunnel. Grade slopes of up to 3.4% on the western ramp (Kloster Valley) and 2.6% on the eastern ramp caused traction troubles for the locomotives. Finally, in 1924, this problem was eliminated with the completion of electrification of the tunnel, followed by the ramp sections in 1925. This electrification of the railway was carried out with a 15 kV, 16.7 Hertz system, allowing heavy trains to be pulled over the route once the tracks and supporting structures, including the Trisanna bridge in 1964, had been upgraded for the increased axle weights.

Today, traffic through the Arlberg railway tunnel has increased considerably, despite competition from road transport through the Arlberg Road Tunnel. This has made it necessary to widen the approach ramps for double tracks. Many long-distance, high-speed EuroCity (Transalpin) and Railjet trains ply the route from Vienna to Vorarlberg over the Arlberg. On the occasion of the World Ski Championships in 2001, the railway station of St. Anton on the eastern side of the Arlberg Tunnel was relocated from the town centre to a new site on the south side of the valley. This required the Arlberg tunnel be lengthened to 10650 m and the construction of the new Wolfsgruben tunnel.

Beginning with 2020, the stretch of track between Landeck-Zams and Ötztal will be selectively double-tracked, to increase capacity and improve the frequency of local services. The program, which was announced in 2018, will likely be completed by 2025, and was chosen over the more expensive full double-tracking plans. The first works are scheduled to take place between 19 and 21 September 2020, during which services will be disrupted.

The next step is a second track in the "Klosterbogen" (named after the monastir "St. Peter") between Bludenz station and Bings station.

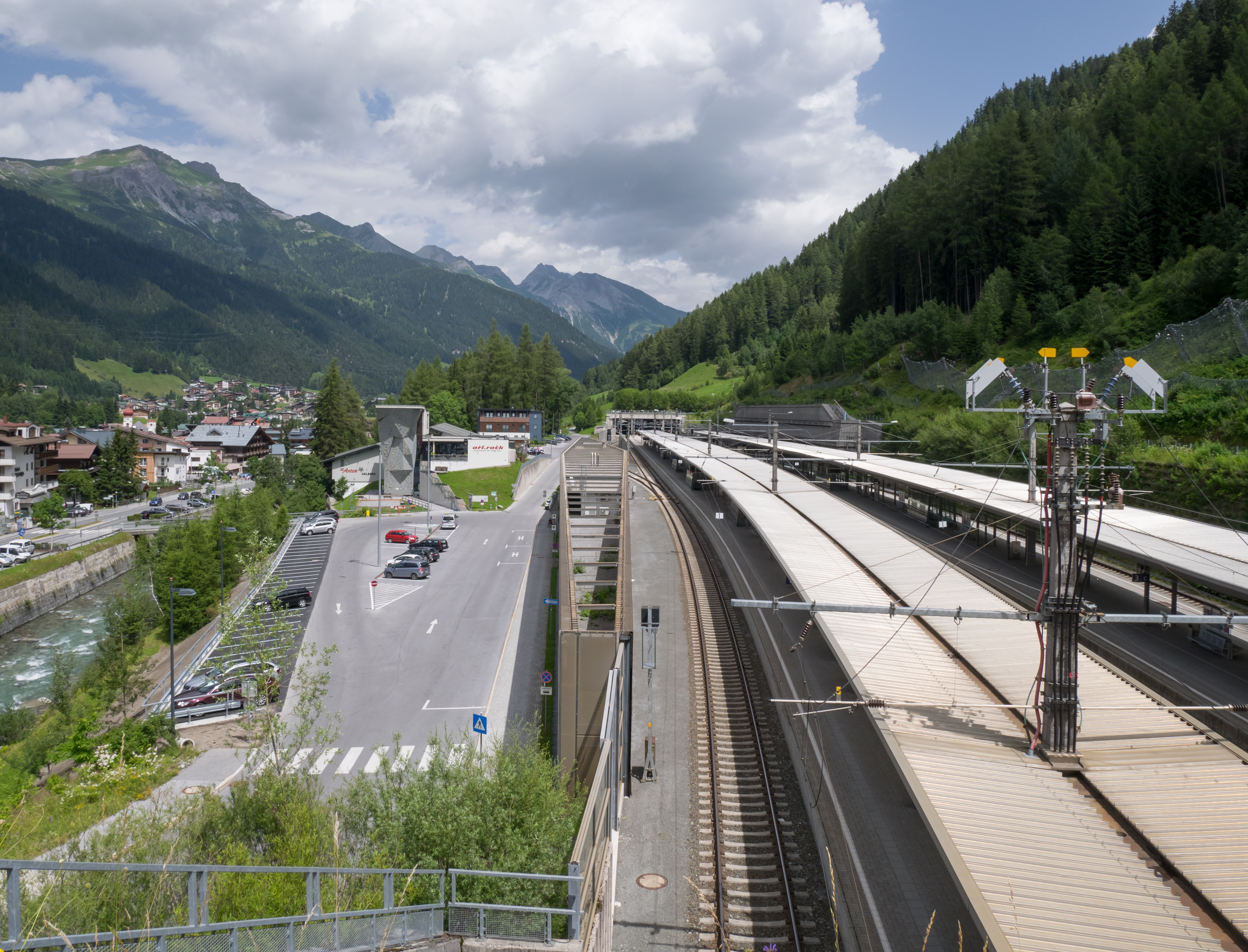
St. Anton railway station since 2001; view ist directed eastwards to the Stanzer Valley

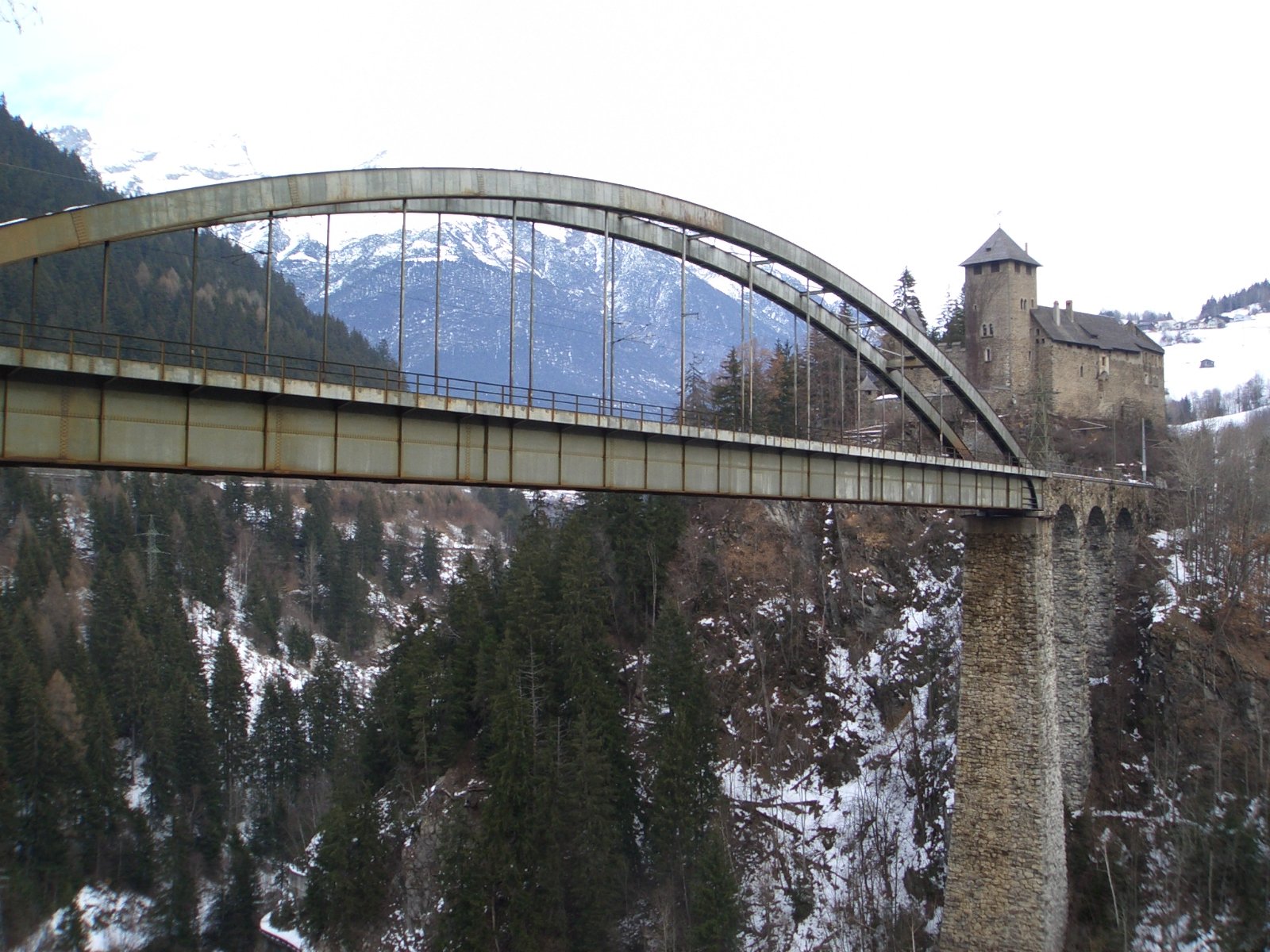
Trisanna bridge (87 m high) and Castle Wiesberg

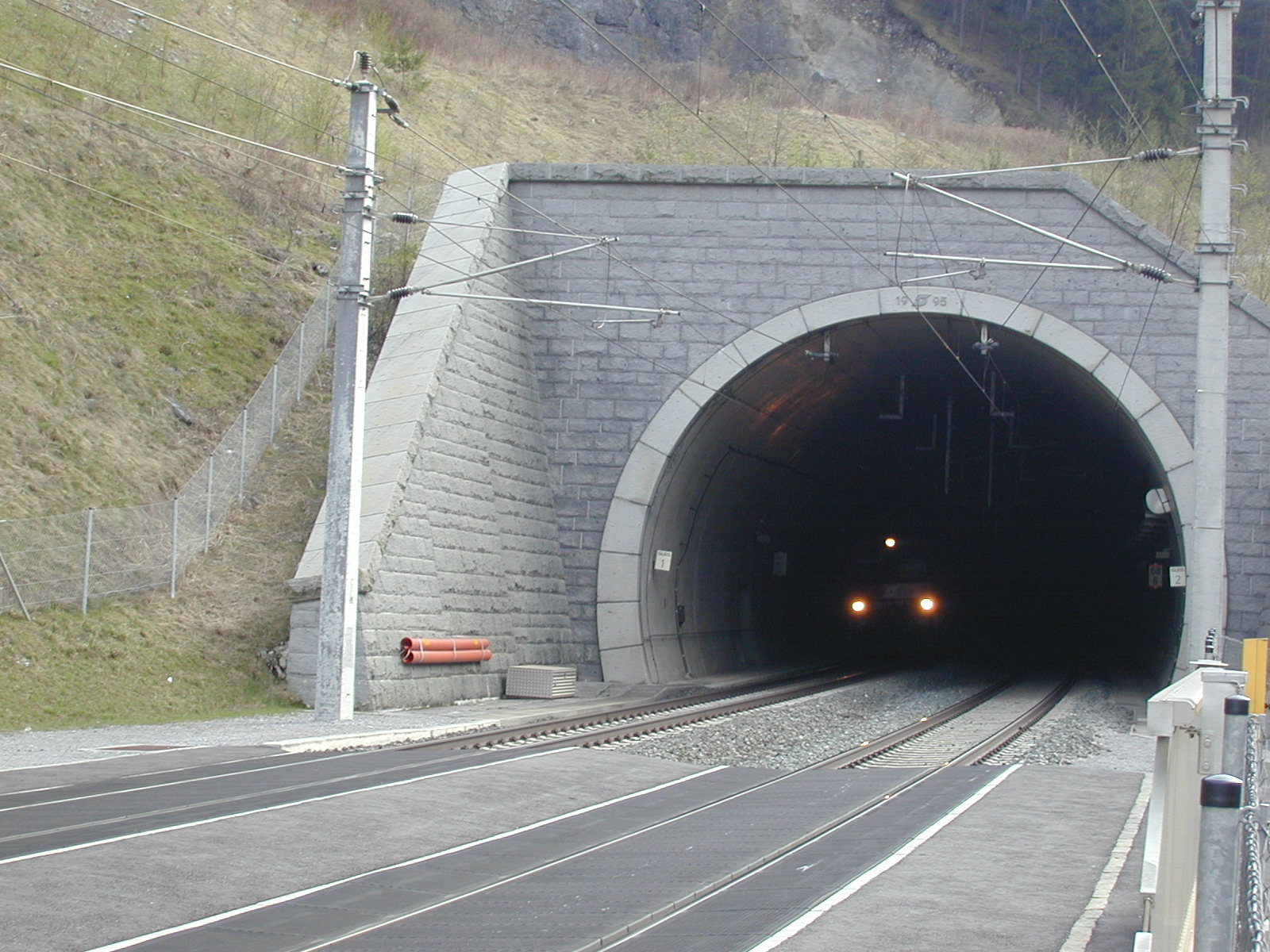
Zammer tunnel near Landeck (eastern mouth)

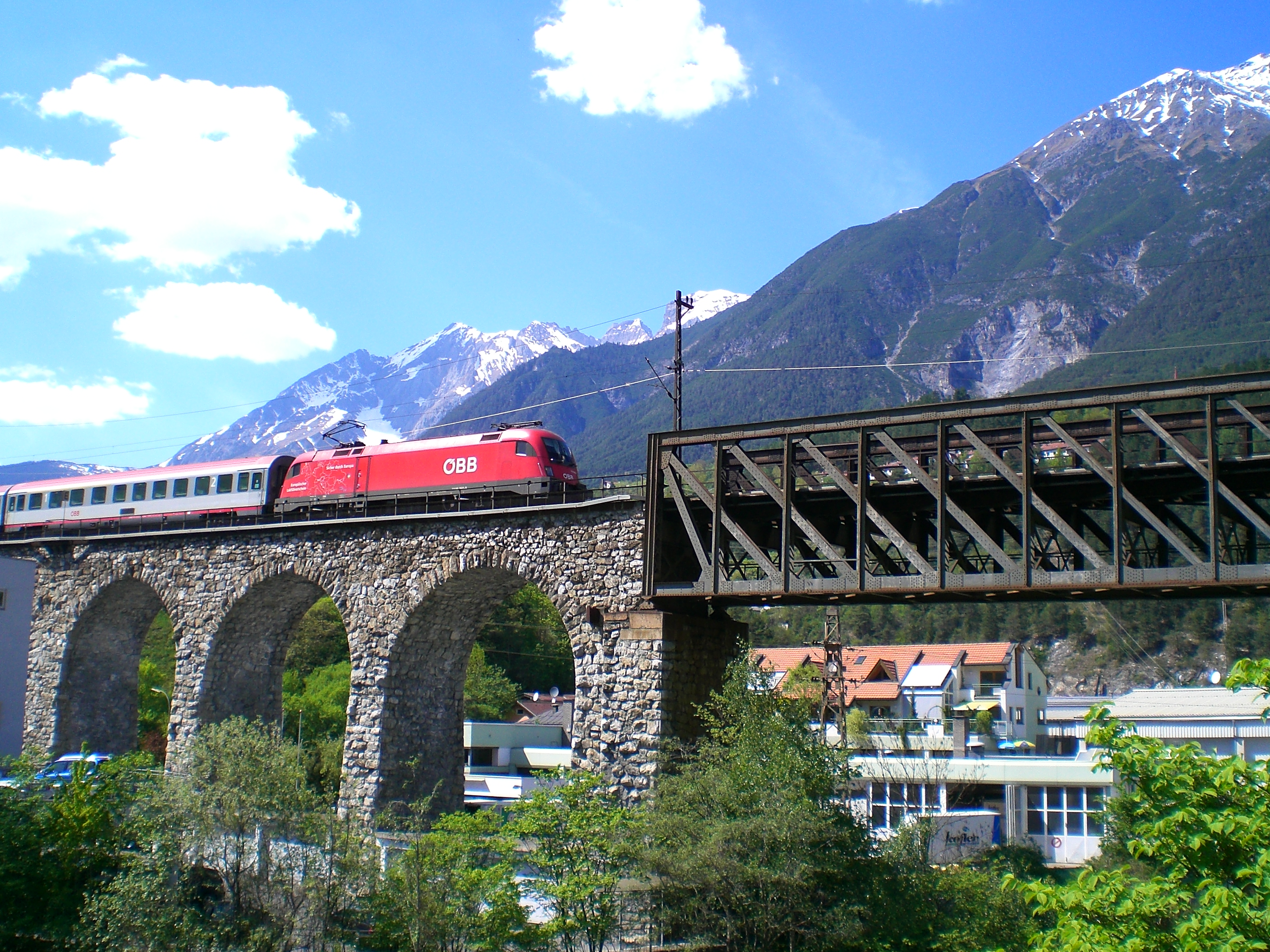
Old Inn bridge in Landeck

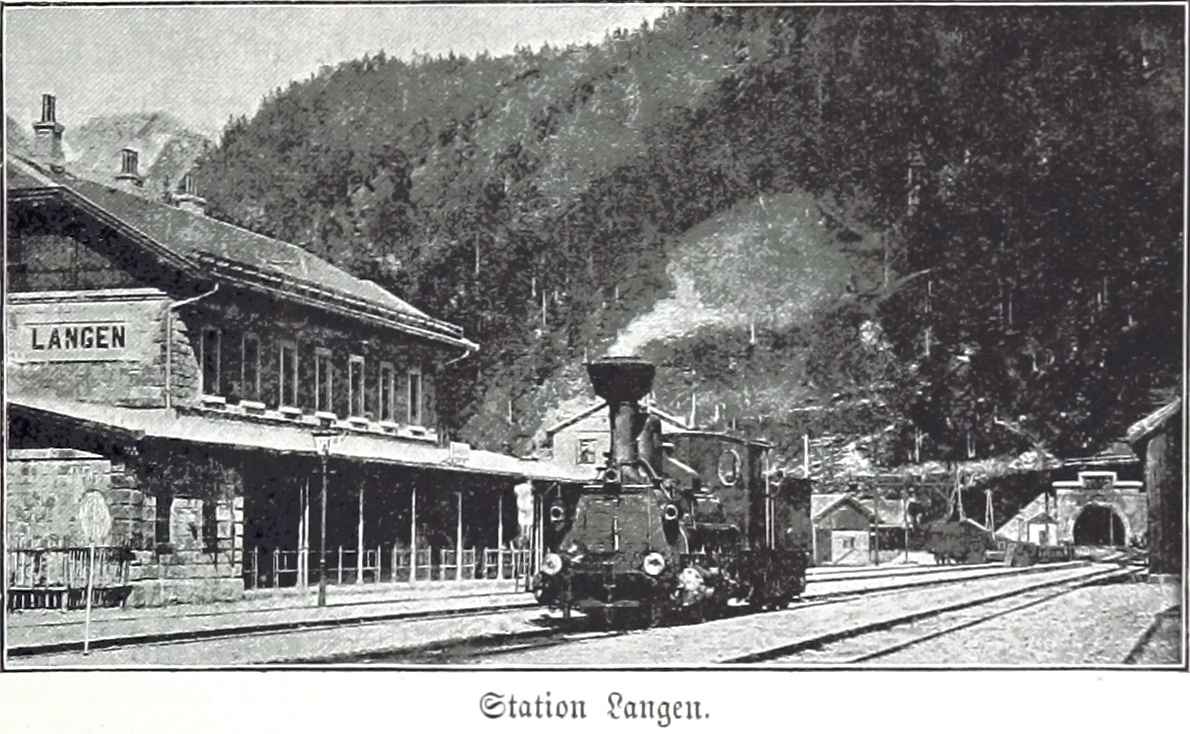
Station Langen am Arlberg with western mouth of the Arlbergtunnel 1894

== Closed stations ==
Due to reduced local traffic, multiple stations between Bludenz and Langen am Arlberg were closed after May 1999 to passenger train services, including (from west to east):

- Bings station located in Bludenz
- Braz station located in Innerbraz
- Hintergasse station located in the Klostertal (47°08′19.5792″N 09°56′47.7168″E, elevation 824 m (AA), closed 10 December 2011)
- Dalaas station located in Dalaas (47°07′38.8812″N 09°59′29.3064″E, elevation 932 m above sea level (AA), closed in May 1999)
- Wald am Arlberg station located in Dalaas
- Klösterle station in the municipality of Klösterle (47°08′3.2856″N 10°05′30.8364″E, elevation 1,157 m above sea level (AA), closed in May 1999)
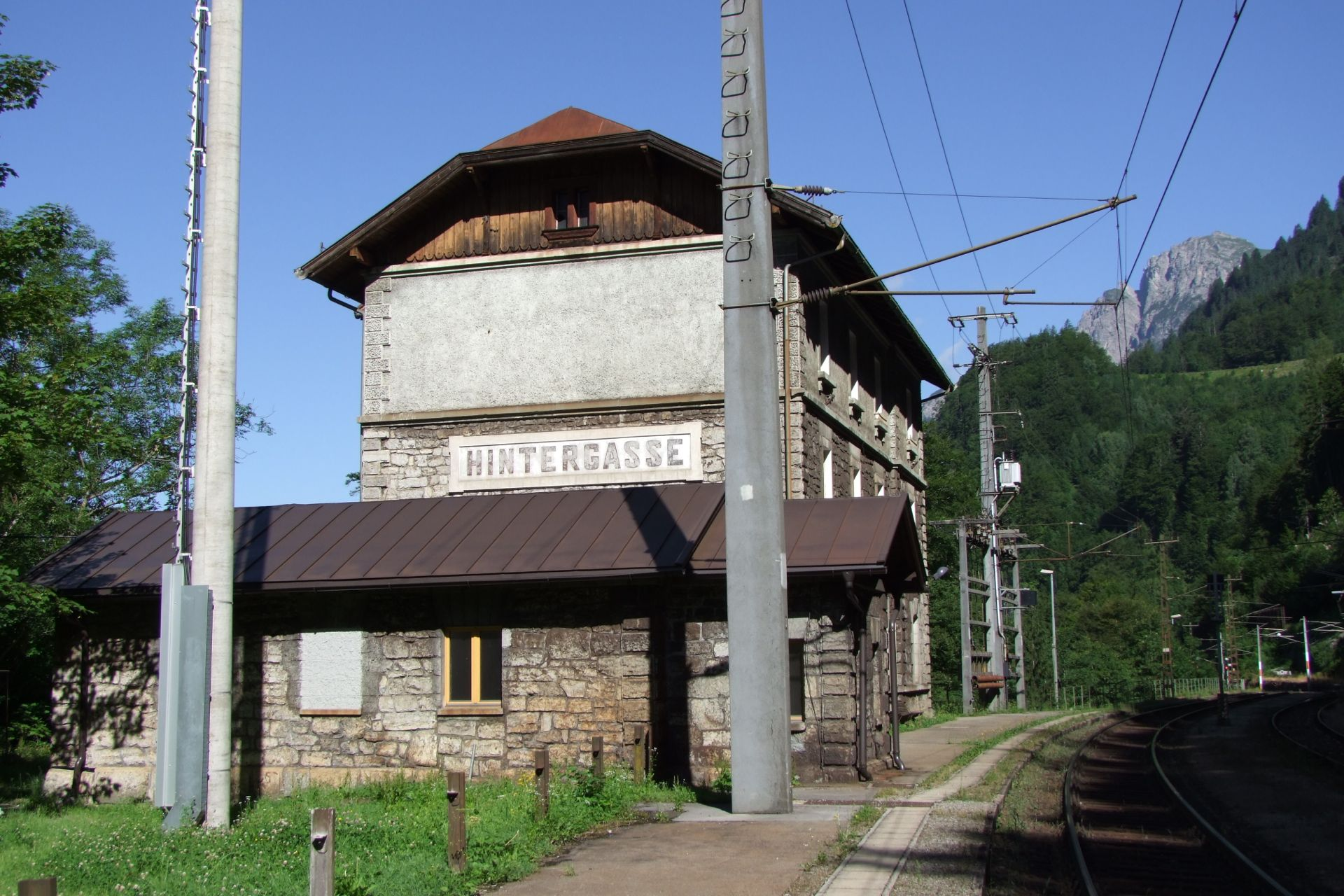
Hintergasse station in 2013

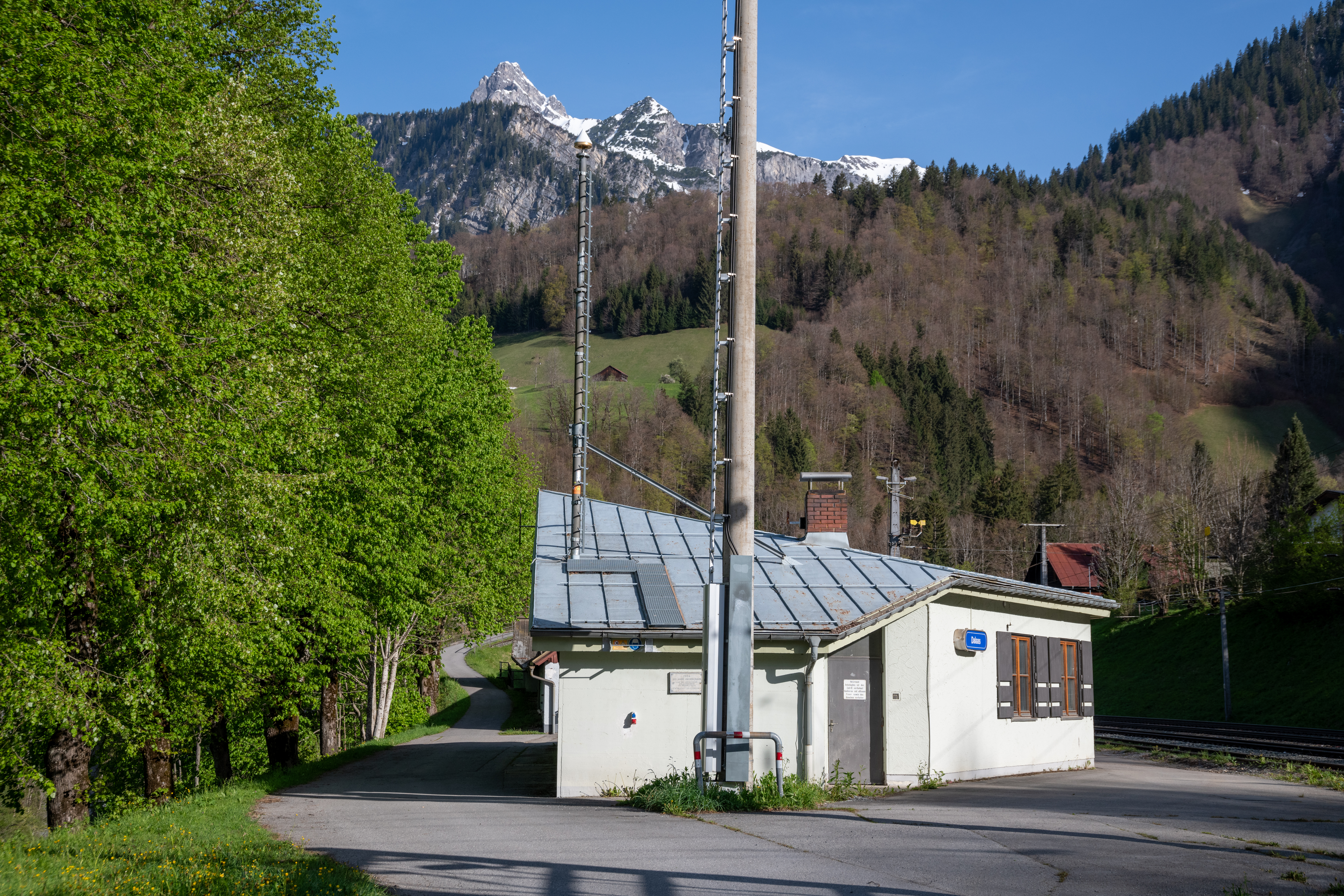
Dalaas station in 2024

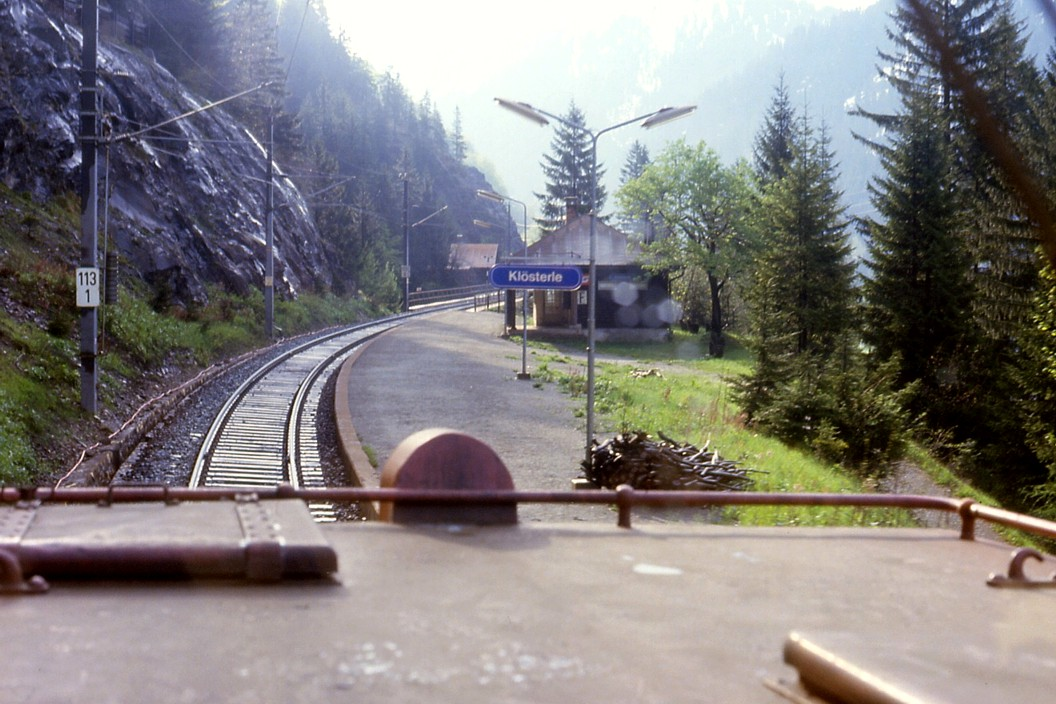
Klösterle station in 1984

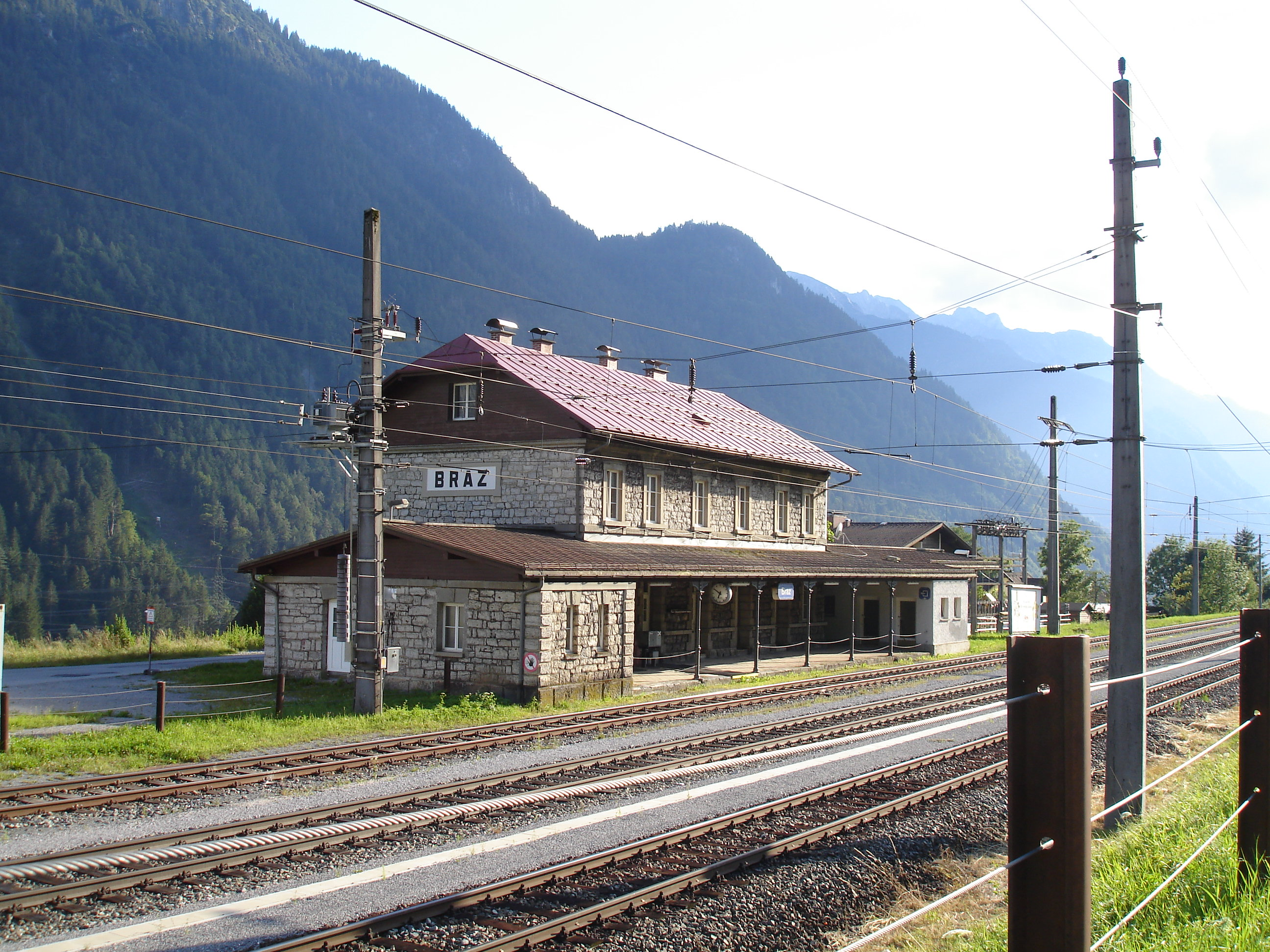
Braz station in 2022

== Locomotives ==
=== Steam locomotives ===
From the universal locomotive, kkStB Class 73 with an operating weight of 55.1 tons, 436 pieces were ordered. Thanks to its capacity of 700 PS they could transport on the level 1,650 tons at 30 km/h, on a slope of 10 ‰ a weight of 580 t at 15 km/h and on a slope of 25 ‰ 220 t, also at 15 km/h. They were mainly used for freight traffic.

== Accidents ==
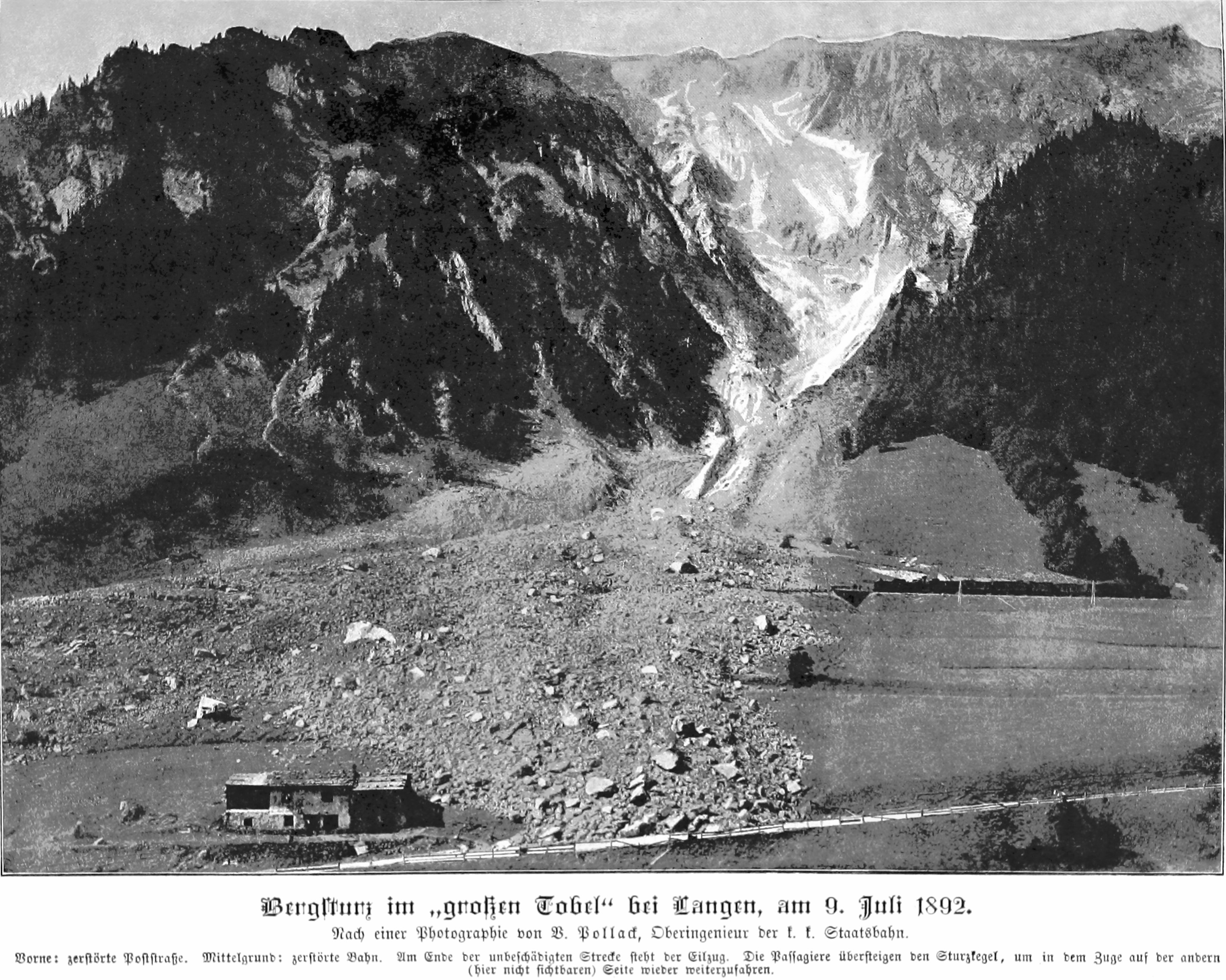
Rockfall with 500 000 m³ from 9th July 1892.

A 500 000 m³-rockfall from the more than 2400 m high mountain "Blisadonagrat" blocked the railway between Langen and Klösterle from July 1892 to 1893. Nobody was injured, but the new "Großtobeltunnel" (505 metres long) must drilled to undercross the rockfall area.

Two steam locomotives losted 14 freight cars after a break of the coupling in the Großtobeltunnel in the near of Langen am Arlberg in January 1924. They rolled down and derailed in Dalaas station with more than 62 mph (100 km/h). They destroyed a large area in this station. 3 railway workers was light injured.

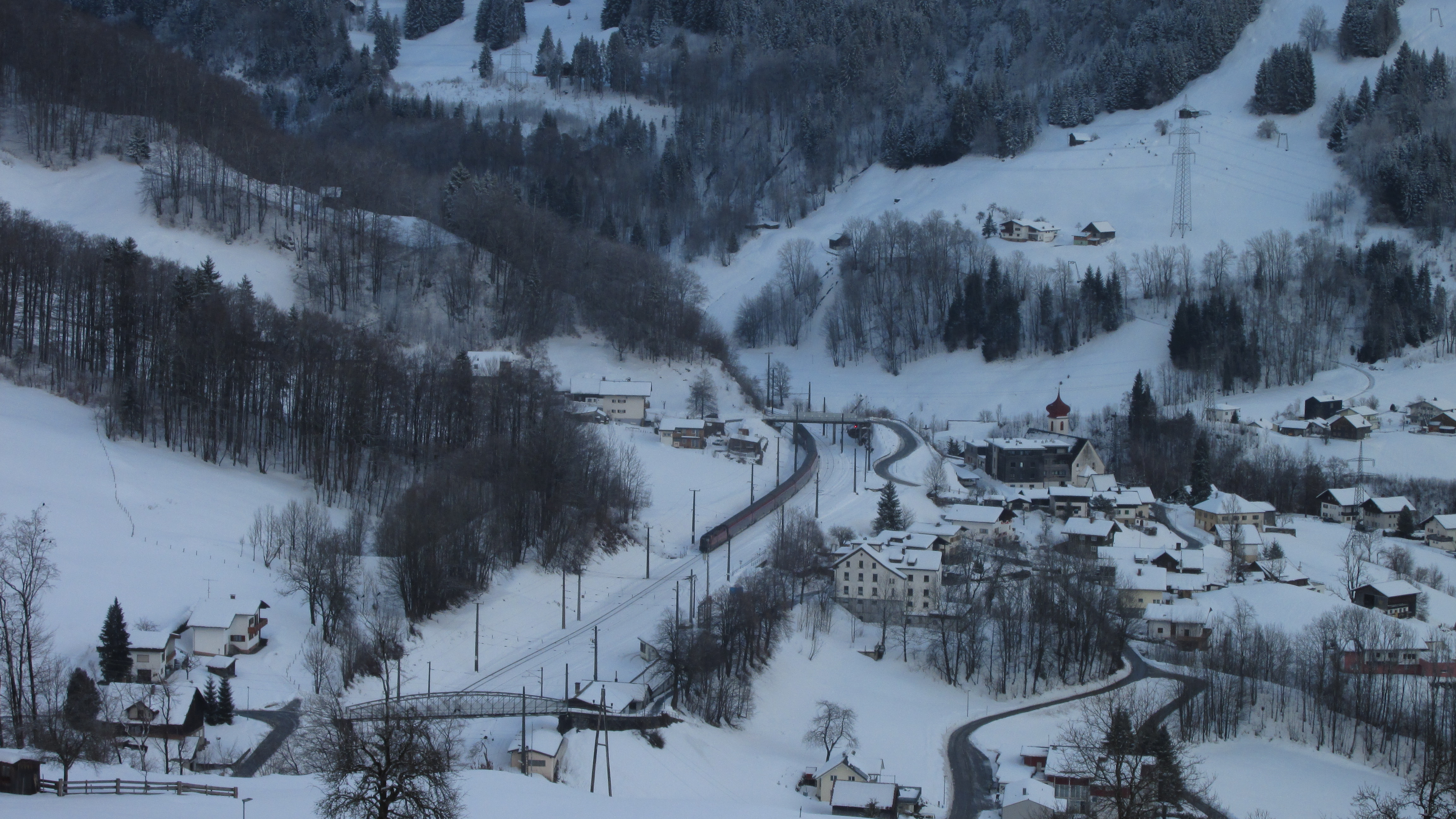
Dalaas station, view from west, in Winter 2022. The alavanche from 1954 cames from the left

An avalanche, cames from the Canyon "Muttentobel" in the north of Dalaas station, hitted it and a waiting train in 12. January 1954. 10 peoples (passengers and the station chief and his family) died. Large parts of the old station building from 1884 was destroyed and it was demolished later. The actually building was constructed after 1954. A memorial in Dalaas station remembers on this tragical day.

A thunderstorm with heavy rain produced a mudslide in 11. August 1995. It destroyed the bridge over the Masonbach near Braz. An Intercity-train to Bludenz can´t stopped. The locomotive and the first cars fell into the river. 4 peoples died.

A freight train at way from Romania to France, loaded with 208 new Dacia-cars, derailed after a brake-defect with 78 mph (125 km/h) in two curves in June 2010. The last 5 freight cars derailed in a left-curve, in the "Brazer Bogen" with radius = 250 m, where 44 mph (70 km/h) was allowed. The locomotive and the first freight cars derailed in the next curve, a right-curve with radius = 242 m before the Braz station. 37 mph (60 km/h) was allowed there. The locomotive chief was injured. 96 vehicles was destroyed totally and 79 heavy damaged. Also the locomotive and most of the railway cars were destroyed totally.

== See also ==
- Arlberg
- Rail transport in Austria
