= Flexenbahn =

Aerial cableway in Stuben am Arlberg, Vorarlberg, Austria

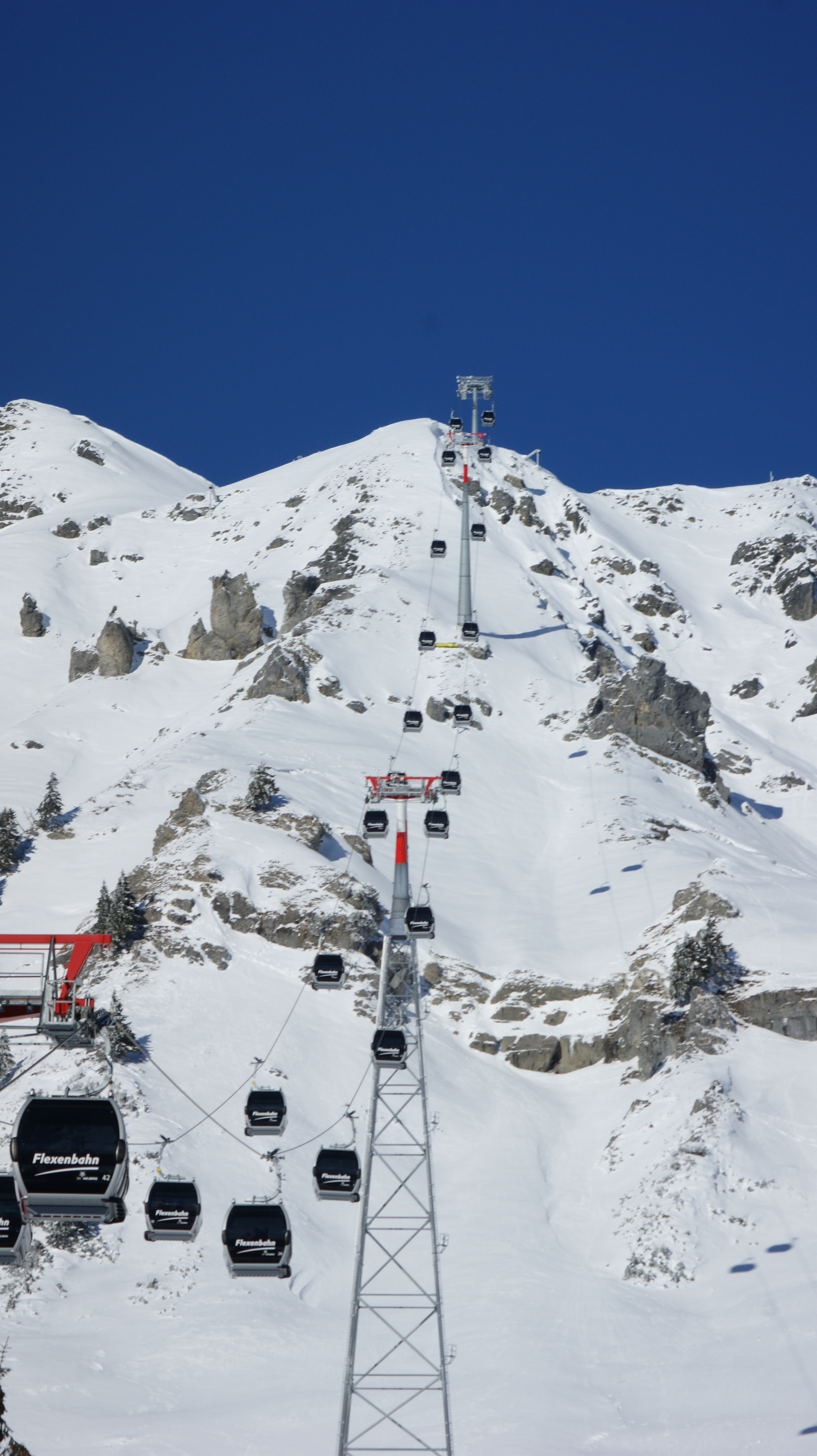
- Interactive map of Flexenbahn

Overview
- Status: Operational
- Character: Cable car
- Location: Stuben am Arlberg, Vorarlberg, Austria (EU)
- Open: 2016

Operation
- Operator: Private

The Flexenbahn is an aerial cableway (cable car) in Stuben am Arlberg in the Austrian province of Vorarlberg. The valley station is located in the area of Alpe Rauz.

== History ==
The Flexenbahn is part of the Ski Arlberg ski area and borders both of the Austrian provinces of Vorarlberg and Tyrol. The Flexenbahn is the key link with which the largest contiguous ski resort in Austria could be realized.
