= Klösterle, Austria =

Klösterle
- Municipality
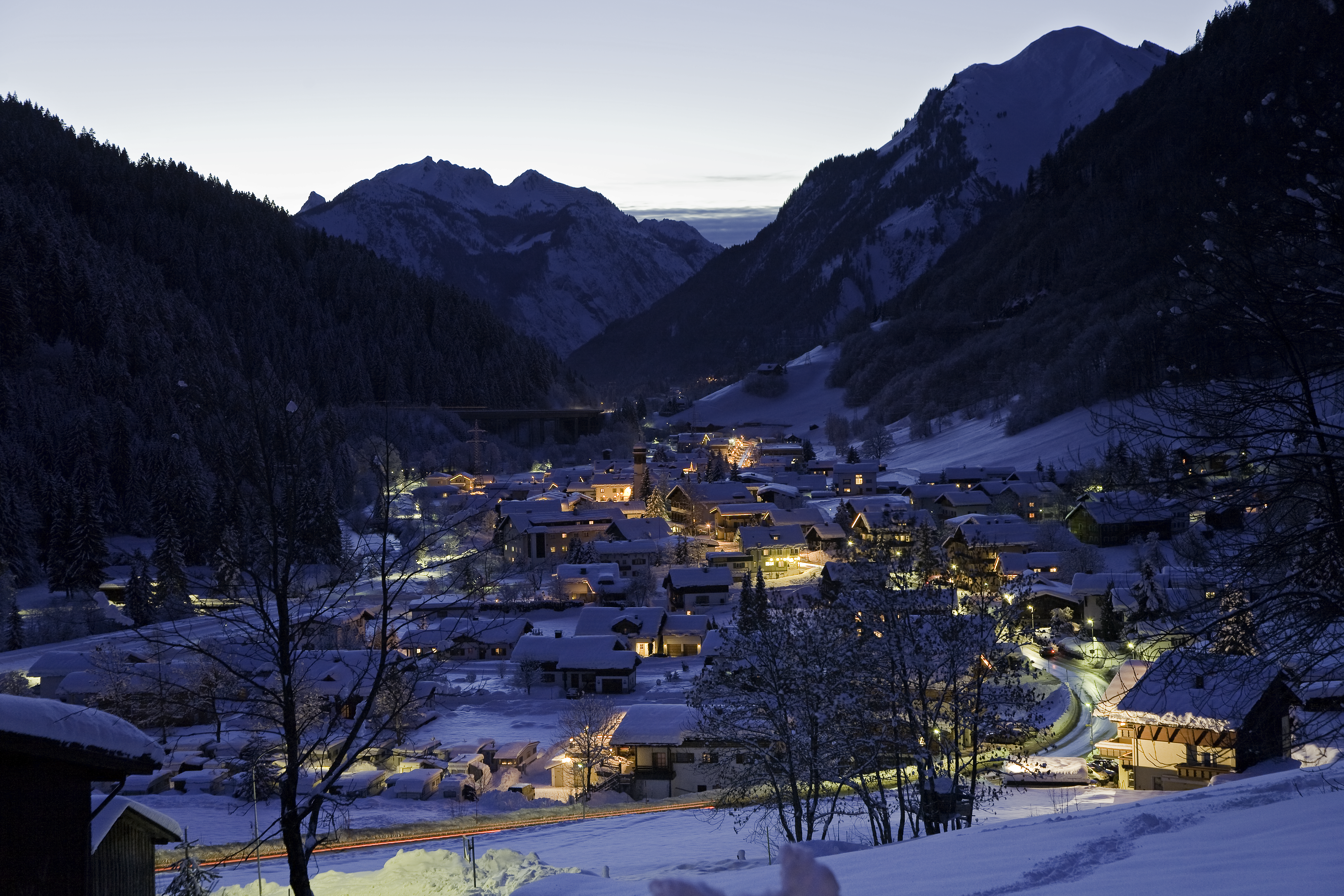
- Klösterle in winter

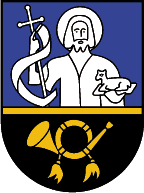
- Coat of arms

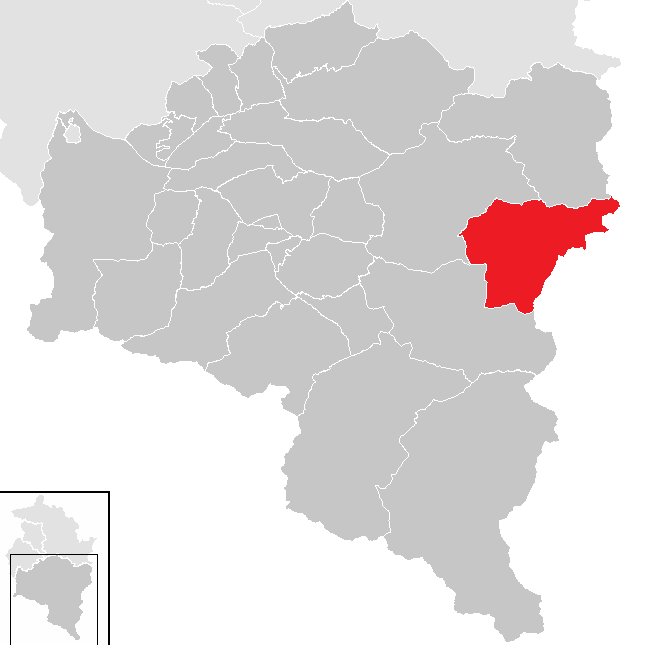
- Location in the district

- Location within Austria
- Coordinates: 47°07′52″N 10°05′31″E
- Country: Austria
- State: Vorarlberg
- District: Bludenz

Government
  - Mayor: Florian Morscher

Area
  - Total: 62.31 km^{2} (24.06 sq mi)
- Elevation: 1,073 m (3,520 ft)

Population (2018-01-01)
  - Total: 688
  - Density: 11.0/km^{2} (28.6/sq mi)
- Time zone: UTC+1 (CET)
  - Summer (DST): UTC+2 (CEST)
- Postal code: 6754
- Area code: 05582
- Vehicle registration: BZ
- Website: www.kloesterle.at

Klösterle is a municipality in the district of Bludenz in the Austrian state of Vorarlberg.

== Population ==
Historical population
Year	Pop.	±%
1869	526	—
1880	1,064	+102.3%
1890	630	−40.8%
1900	703	+11.6%
1910	721	+2.6%
1923	764	+6.0%
1934	712	−6.8%
1939	721	+1.3%
1951	793	+10.0%
1961	799	+0.8%
1971	860	+7.6%
1981	782	−9.1%
1991	747	−4.5%
2001	767	+2.7%
2011	684	−10.8%

== Climate ==
Climate data for Klösterle, Austria (Langen Am Arlberg) 1981–2010
Month	Jan	Feb	Mar	Apr	May	Jun	Jul	Aug	Sep	Oct	Nov	Dec	Year
Record high °C (°F)	11.2 (52.2)	15.2 (59.4)	18.6 (65.5)	23.2 (73.8)	28.6 (83.5)	30.5 (86.9)	32.0 (89.6)	32.0 (89.6)	27.6 (81.7)	25.4 (77.7)	20.0 (68.0)	15.0 (59.0)	32.0 (89.6)
Mean daily maximum °C (°F)	1.6 (34.9)	2.3 (36.1)	5.3 (41.5)	9.3 (48.7)	15.0 (59.0)	17.8 (64.0)	20.1 (68.2)	19.5 (67.1)	15.8 (60.4)	12.3 (54.1)	5.8 (42.4)	2.2 (36.0)	10.6 (51.1)
Daily mean °C (°F)	−2.4 (27.7)	−2.2 (28.0)	0.9 (33.6)	4.4 (39.9)	9.6 (49.3)	12.4 (54.3)	14.5 (58.1)	13.8 (56.8)	10.3 (50.5)	7.1 (44.8)	1.6 (34.9)	−1.4 (29.5)	5.7 (42.3)
Mean daily minimum °C (°F)	−4.7 (23.5)	−4.8 (23.4)	−2.3 (27.9)	0.9 (33.6)	5.5 (41.9)	8.3 (46.9)	10.7 (51.3)	10.5 (50.9)	7.4 (45.3)	4.3 (39.7)	−0.9 (30.4)	−3.7 (25.3)	2.6 (36.7)
Record low °C (°F)	−27.0 (−16.6)	−22.8 (−9.0)	−17.0 (1.4)	−10.8 (12.6)	−4.0 (24.8)	−1.8 (28.8)	0.4 (32.7)	0.0 (32.0)	−2.0 (28.4)	−10.0 (14.0)	−16.2 (2.8)	−16.5 (2.3)	−27.0 (−16.6)
Average precipitation mm (inches)	117 (4.6)	105 (4.1)	130 (5.1)	100 (3.9)	138 (5.4)	175 (6.9)	196 (7.7)	203 (8.0)	141 (5.6)	98 (3.9)	112 (4.4)	121 (4.8)	1,637 (64.4)
Average relative humidity (%) (at 14:00)	66.2	65.3	63.3	59.9	57.0	60.6	61.5	64.6	65.9	63.8	68.5	69.0	63.8
Source: Central Institute for Meteorology and Geodynamics

Climate data for Klösterle, Austria (Langen Am Arlberg) 1971–2000
Month	Jan	Feb	Mar	Apr	May	Jun	Jul	Aug	Sep	Oct	Nov	Dec	Year
Record high °C (°F)	11.2 (52.2)	15.2 (59.4)	18.2 (64.8)	20.5 (68.9)	26.0 (78.8)	29.0 (84.2)	32.0 (89.6)	31.0 (87.8)	29.0 (84.2)	24.0 (75.2)	20.0 (68.0)	15.0 (59.0)	32.0 (89.6)
Mean daily maximum °C (°F)	1.7 (35.1)	2.4 (36.3)	4.9 (40.8)	7.9 (46.2)	14.1 (57.4)	16.6 (61.9)	19.1 (66.4)	19.0 (66.2)	15.7 (60.3)	11.7 (53.1)	5.2 (41.4)	2.3 (36.1)	10.1 (50.2)
Daily mean °C (°F)	−1.7 (28.9)	−1.6 (29.1)	0.6 (33.1)	3.3 (37.9)	8.8 (47.8)	11.5 (52.7)	14.0 (57.2)	13.9 (57.0)	10.7 (51.3)	7.1 (44.8)	1.5 (34.7)	−0.7 (30.7)	5.6 (42.1)
Mean daily minimum °C (°F)	−4.6 (23.7)	−4.5 (23.9)	−2.4 (27.7)	0.1 (32.2)	5.0 (41.0)	7.6 (45.7)	10.2 (50.4)	10.3 (50.5)	7.4 (45.3)	4.0 (39.2)	−1.3 (29.7)	−3.4 (25.9)	2.4 (36.3)
Record low °C (°F)	−27.0 (−16.6)	−22.8 (−9.0)	−22.0 (−7.6)	−10.8 (12.6)	−6.0 (21.2)	−0.4 (31.3)	0.0 (32.0)	0.0 (32.0)	−1.5 (29.3)	−8.0 (17.6)	−16.2 (2.8)	−18.0 (−0.4)	−27.0 (−16.6)
Average precipitation mm (inches)	117.7 (4.63)	102.4 (4.03)	122.7 (4.83)	103.9 (4.09)	131.5 (5.18)	191.6 (7.54)	209.3 (8.24)	186.7 (7.35)	137.8 (5.43)	103.9 (4.09)	119.0 (4.69)	127.1 (5.00)	1,653.6 (65.10)
Average snowfall cm (inches)	138.9 (54.7)	147.0 (57.9)	155.6 (61.3)	72.8 (28.7)	14.4 (5.7)	0.1 (0.0)	0.0 (0.0)	0.6 (0.2)	1.6 (0.6)	13.3 (5.2)	82.9 (32.6)	133.8 (52.7)	761.0 (299.6)
Average precipitation days (≥ 1.0 mm)	11.8	10.6	13.1	13.9	14.6	17.3	16.7	16.0	12.5	10.6	12.1	12.6	161.8
Average relative humidity (%) (at 14:00)	64.2	63.7	61.6	60.6	56.5	61.2	60.7	63.2	63.1	62.0	68.3	66.3	62.6
Source: Central Institute for Meteorology and Geodynamics

== Transport ==
The municipality is located along an expressway, the Arlberg Schnellstraße (S16), between Bludenz and Zams (Tyrol).

Langen am Arlberg is a railway station on the Arlberg Railway line (Bludenz–Innsbruck Hauptbahnhof), which is called at by some Railjet long-distance trains. A second railway station within the municipality was Klösterle, which is defunct.

The Flexenbahn is an aerial tramway in Stuben am Arlberg.

== See also ==
- Horizon Field
