= Arlberg =

Massif in Austria

Arlberg Pass
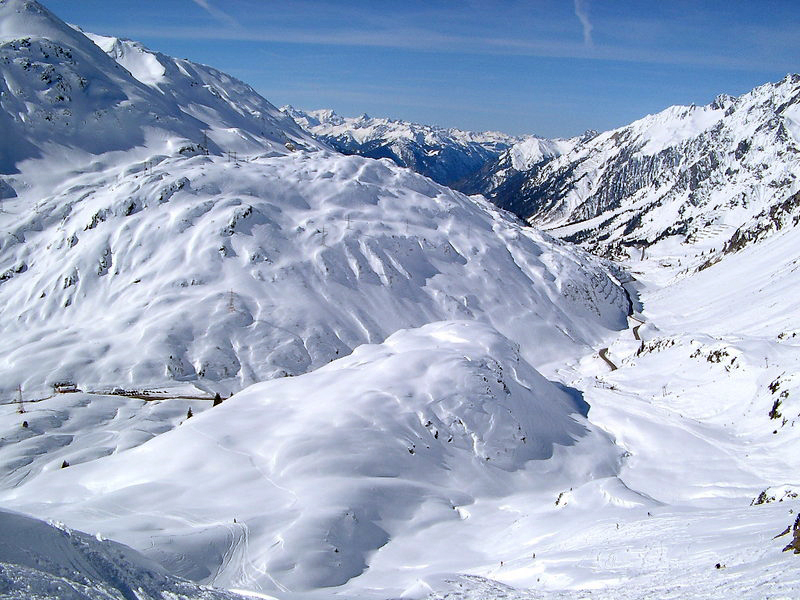
- View over the Arlberg and the pass road in winter

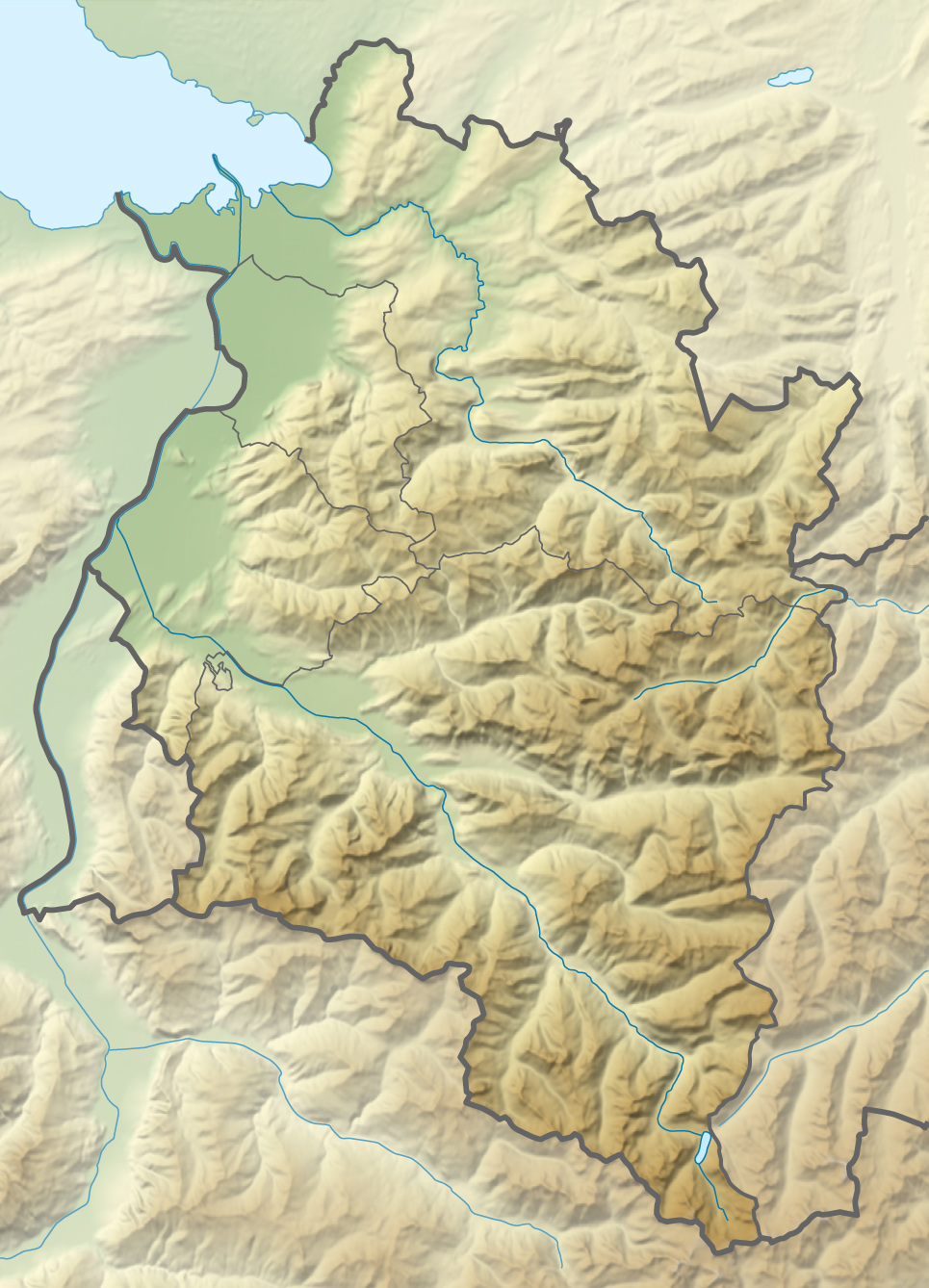
- Location within Alps Location within Vorarlberg Location within Austria
- Elevation: 1,793 metres (5,883 ft)
- Traversed by: Federal Highway B 197

Third Approach
- Location: Austria
- Range: Alps
- Coordinates: 47°07′48″N 10°12′40″E

The Arlberg (German: [ˈaʁlˌbɛʁk], also: Arlberg Pass) is a mountain pass between states of Tyrol and Vorarlberg in Austria. Ski resorts at the Arlberg include Lech, Zürs, Stuben, St. Christoph, St. Anton, Oberlech, Stubenbach, Zug, and Warth. It is the mountain pass from which the Austrian State of Vorarlberg, meaning 'before the Arl mountain', gets its name.

== Geography ==
The Arlberg connects the Klostertal Valley in the west with the Stanzer Valley in the east. Together with the Flexenpass, it borders three mountain groups: the Verwall in the south, the Lechquellen mountains in the northwest, and the Lechtal Alps in the northeast. The Valluga, which stands as the highest mountain of the Arlberg, and the Trittkopf, southwest of the Lechtal Alps, dominate the pass. Four communities meet: on the Vorarlberg side, Lech and Klösterle–Stuben; on the Tyrol side, Kaisers and St. Anton. The watershed between the Rhine and the Danube rivers runs south from the Albonagrat to the Passhöhe, over the Valluga and Trittkopf, to the Flexenpass, and it traces from the Flexenspitz the southern edge of the Lechquellen mountains westward to the Klostertal.

== Pass roads and the Arlberg tunnel ==
The old pass route was known since the 14th century in the form of a narrow mule track when people began to trade salt in the region. However, because the Arlberg was very poorly developed, for centuries people avoided the route and took detours over the Fern Pass or Immenstadt for trading. The development of the textile industry and of the postal service, however, led to the roads being surfaced in 1824.

With the rise of motor traffic in the 20th century, however, this became inadequate. It was decided that a 14-kilometre-long (9-mile) Arlberg Road Tunnel would be built between Langen and St. Anton. On July 5, 1974, the work began and the passage was opened to traffic on December 1, 1978. The tunnel has a toll; however, the old road over the 1,800 m (5,906 ft) pass is toll-free. A peculiarity of the tunnel is that it actually consists of two tunnels. On the Tyrolian side it is built over the Rosanna Gorge before the actual massif rises up in the direction of Vorarlberg over the tunnel.

== Arlberg Railway ==
The Arlberg railway connects Innsbruck with Bludenz. Between St. Anton and Langen it runs through the 10.25 kilometres (6.37 miles) long Arlbergtunnel.

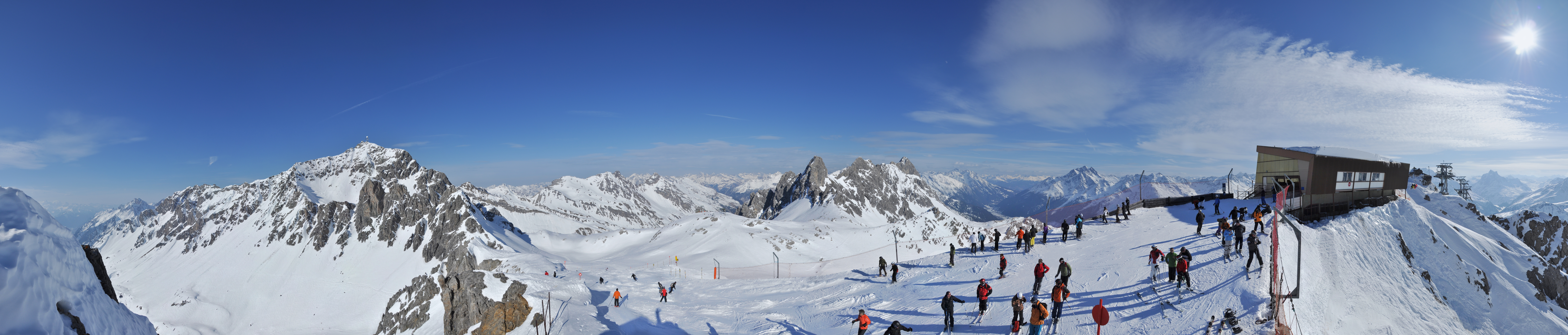
View from the Schindlerspitze

== Tourism ==
Tourism is the main source of income for Arlberg villages and their inhabitants and plays a vital role in the region.

Today, "Arlberg" is a brand for the winter sports areas around the Arlberg Pass, in particular the ski areas of Lech, Zürs, Stuben, Klösterle and St. Christoph, St. Anton am Arlberg.

The area is known for its long winter sports tradition. As early as 1901, the Arlberg ski club was founded and two years later a first club competition was held. In 1904 the first general Arlberg race took place, 1928 the first of the famous Arlberg Kandahar races. In 1921, under the leadership of Hannes Schneider, the ski school Arlberg was the first ski school in the region.

In 1937, the first lifts were built in St. Anton and in Zürs. It was the first ski-lift built by Konrad Doppelmayr and Sepp Bildstein. With the 2001 FIS Ski World Cup in St. Anton, alpine ski racing came back to the Arlberg and thus to its roots. In 2021, St. Anton am Arlberg will be holding a combination ski race with a slalom and a super-G on January 9 and 10 as part of the FIS Alpine Skiing World Cup 2020–21.

Today, the contiguous ski resorts on three mountains around Lech and Zürs, the Arena on Gampen, Kapall, Galzig and Valluga above St. Anton and St. Christoph, form a ski resort with 87 lifts, 305 km of groomed slopes and 200 km of deep snow slopes. Thanks to the many winter sports enthusiasts, tourism at the Arlberg is of great importance. Between 1 November 2001 and 31 October 2002, more than one million overnight stays were counted for the first time.

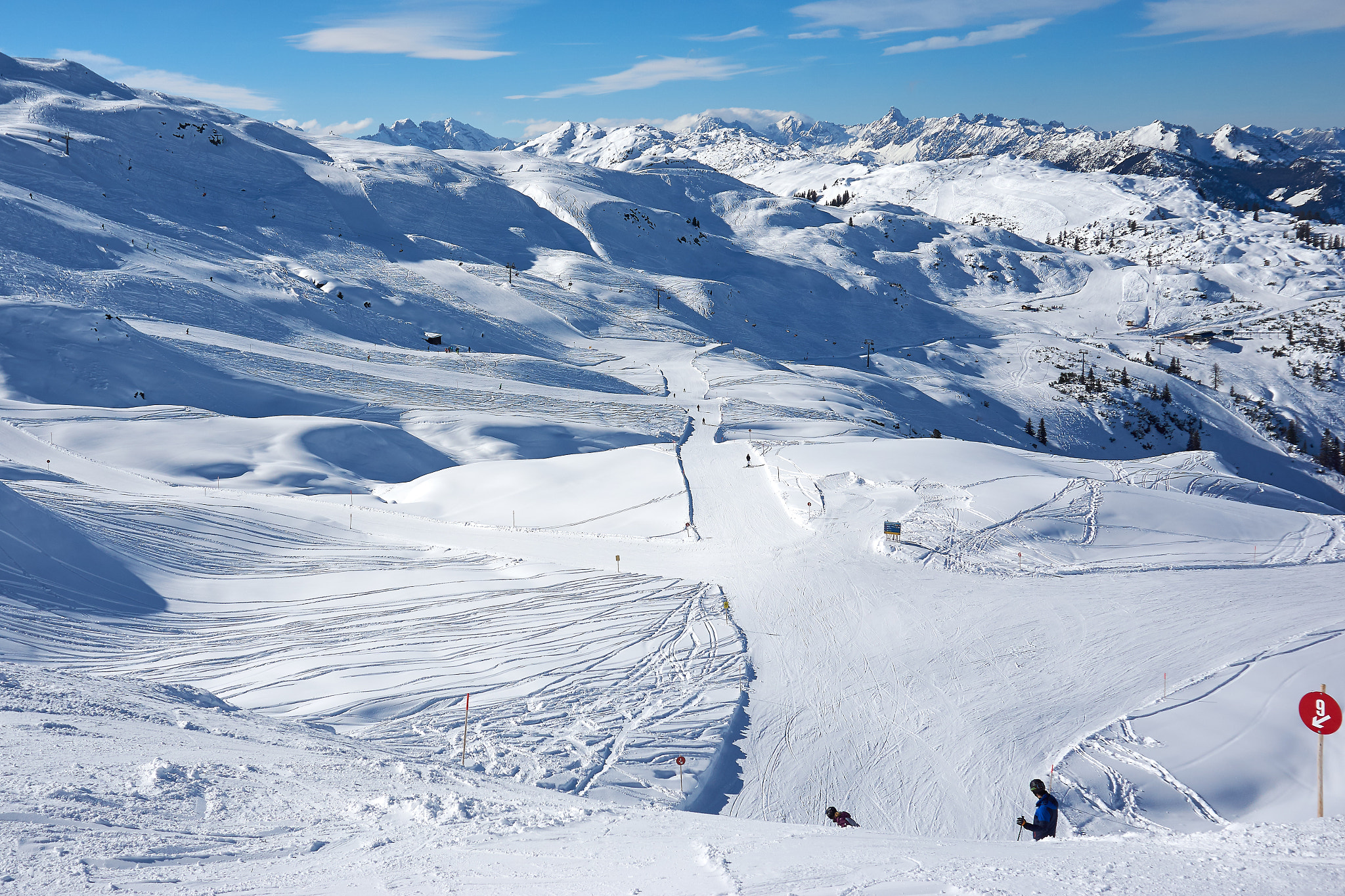
Ski Arlberg: View from the Sonnenkopf

=== Ski Arlberg ===
Ski Arlberg is the biggest connected ski resort in Austria, consisting of the villages of Lech, Oberlech, Zürs and Zug, which were linked to Warth and Schröcken in 2013–14. The ski area comprises 15 aerial tramways, 45 chairlifts and 28 drag lifts.
The White Ring, the world's longest ski circuit (22 km), is located within the Ski Arlberg area. Since 2005–06, annual White Ring races have been held.

== See also ==
- List of highest paved roads in Europe
- List of mountain passes
