= Gretchen =

Name list

- Gender: Female
- Language: German

Origin
- Region of origin: Germany

Other names
- Variant forms: Greta, Grete, Margaret, Margarete
- Derived: A major character in Goethe's Faust

Gretchen (German: [ˈɡʁeːtçən], English: /ˈɡrɛtʃən/ GRETCH-ən; literal translation: "Little Grete" or "Little Greta") is a female given name of German origin that is most prevalent in the United States.

Its popularity increased because a major character in Goethe's Faust (1808) has this name. In German, the Gretchenfrage ("question by Gretchen"), derived from Faust, is an idiom for a direct question that aims at the core of a problem and that should reveal the intentions and mindset of the questioned. The question is usually inconvenient to the questioned since they shall confess to something crucial they were intentionally or unintentionally vague about before.

In German-speaking countries, Gretchen is not frequent as a stand-alone given name, but as a colloquial diminutive or pet name of Grete (Greta), which itself is a short form of Margarete (Margaret).

== People ==
- Gretchen (singer) (born 1959), Brazilian singer
- Gretchen Abaniel (born 1985), Filipino professional boxer
- Gretchen Albrecht (born 1943), New Zealand painter
- Gretchen Andrew (born 1988), American artist
- Gretchen Baer (born 1963), American painter
- Gretchen Bangert (born 1966), American politician
- Gretchen Barretto (born 1970), Filipina actress
- Gretchen J. Berg (born 1971), an American TV writer/producer
- Gretchen Berland, American physician
- Gretchen Bleiler (born 1981), professional halfpipe snowboarder and pioneer
- Gretchen Brewin (born 1938), Canadian politician
- Gretchen Bulova, American politician
- Gretchen Campbell, American physicist
- Gretchen Carlson (born 1966), former Miss America and current TV host
- Gretchen Chapman, psychologist
- Gretchen Corbett (born 1947), American actress
- Gretchen Cryer (born 1935), American writer, actress, and lyricist
- Gretchen Daily (born 1964), American biologist
- Gretchen Dobervich (born 1973), American politician
- Gretchen Donlan (born 1993), American pair skater
- Gretchen Dow Simpson, American painter
- Gretchen Driskell (born 1958), American politician, a former member of the Michigan House of Representatives, and candidate for Michigan's 7th congressional district in 2016.
- Gretchen Dutschke-Klotz (born 1942) German-American author and former activist
- Gretchen Dykstra (born 1948), previous President and CEO of the World Trade Center Memorial Foundation
- Gretchen Egolf (born 1973), American actress
- Gretchen Espina (born 1988), Filipino singer
- Gretchen Faust (born 1961), American artist
- Gretchen Franklin (1911–2005), English actress
- Gretchen Fraser (1919–1994), American alpine skier
- Gretchen Fullido (born 1984), Filipina news anchor and model
- Gretchen Garber Billings (1914–1999), American journalist
- Gretchen Gerzina (born 1950), American historian
- Gretchen Gierach (21st century), American epidemiologist
- Gretchen Goldman, environmental engineer and science communicator
- Gretchen Gotay (born 1980), Puerto Rican swimmer
- Gretchen Guess (born 1969), American businesswoman and politician
- Gretchen Hau, Puerto Rican lawyer and senator
- Gretchen Hehenberger (1918–2012), Austrian gymnast
- Gretchen S. Herbert, US Navy admiral
- Gretchen Ho (born 1990), Filipino volleyball player and TV presenter
- Gretchen Hoffman (born 1957), American politician
- Gretchen Hofmann (21st century), professor at the University of California
- Gretchen Jones, American fashion designer
- Gretchen Kafoury (1942–2015), American politician
- Gretchen Kalonji (born 1953), American scientist and academic administrator
- Gretchen Keppel-Aleks (21st century), an American climate scientist
- Gretchen Kirby (21st century), American educator
- Gretchen Kivell (born 1948), New Zealand chemical engineer
- Gretchen Lederer (1891–1955), German actress
- Gretchen Lieberum (21st century), American singer
- Gretchen S. Lund (born 1975), American judge
- Gretchen Magers (born 1964), a former professional tennis player
- Gretchen Malalad (born 1980), Filipina 2005 Southeast Asian Games karate gold medalist
- Gretchen Massey (born 1969), radio host and performer
- Gretchen Matthews (born 1973), mathematician
- Gretchen W. McClain, American business executive
- Gretchen McCord, Texan librarian and lawyer
- Gretchen McCulloch, Canadian linguist
- Gretchen Menn, American guitarist and composer
- Gretchen Merrill (1925–1965), American figure skater
- Gretchen Mol (born 1972), American actress
- Gretchen Morgenson (born 1956), Pulitzer Prize-winning journalist
- Gretchen Oehler (1943–2001), American actress
- Gretchen Ortiz, Puerto Rican sailor
- Gretchen Osgood Warren (1868–1961), actress, singer, poet, and muse
- Gretchen Parlato (born 1976), American jazz singer
- Gretchen Passantino (1953–2014), Christian apologist
- Gretchen Peters (journalist), American journalist and advisor
- Gretchen Peters (born 1957), American country singer
- Gretchen Phillips (born 1963), American musician
- Gretchen Polhemus (born 1965), the 38th Miss USA
- Gretchen Quie (1927–2015), American artist and First Lady of Minnesota
- Gretchen Quintana (born 1984), Cuban heptathlete
- Gretchen Ramsden, South African actress
- Gretchen Rau (1939–2006), professional property master, set decorator, and art director
- Gretchen Reydams-Schils, American classicist
- Gretchen Ritter (21st century), American academic administrator
- Gretchen Rubin (born 1965), American author and attorney
- Gretchen Rush (born 1964), American tennis player
- Gretchen Rydin, American politician
- Gretchen Schuette, American academic leader in Oregon
- Gretchen Shappert, American lawyer
- Gretchen Sibley (1914–2013), American zoologist
- Gretchen Ulion (born 1972), American ice hockey player
- Gretchen Walsh (born 2003), American swimmer
- Gretchen Whitmer (born 1971), 49th governor of Michigan and former Michigan state senator
- Gretchen Wilson (born 1973), Grammy award-winning American country music singer-songwriter
- Gretchen Woodman Rogers (1881–1967), American painter
- Gretchen Wyler (1932–2007), American actress
- Gretchen Zigante (born 1964), American soccer player

== Fictional characters ==
- Gretchen, a character from Camp Lakebottom
- Gretchen, a character from Camp Lazlo
- Gretchen, a character in James A. Michener's novel The Drifters
- Gretchen, a character from Faust: The First Part of the Tragedy
- Gretchen, a character from Donald Fagen's song "The Goodbye Look", on his album The Nightfly
- Gretchen, a character from Invader Zim
- Gretchen (Gräuben), a character from Journey to the Center of the Earth by Jules Verne
- Gretchen, a character played by Yvonne Mai in the 2019 film The Last Faust
- Gretchen, a character in George Tabori's farce stage-adaptation of Hitler's Mein Kampf
- Gretchen, a character from Phineas and Ferb
- Greedy Gretchen, a character who appeared in episodes of the TV sitcoms Three's Company and Three's a Crowd
- Gretchen, a character played by Eden Sher in Weeds
- Gretchen, a character from Zombillenium
- Gretchen Berg, character from Heroes
- Gretchen Bodinski, a character from Suits
- Gretchen Cutler, a character from You're the Worst
- Gretchen Grimlock, the antagonist in Cryptids Island on the online game Poptropica.
- Gretchen Grundler, one of six main characters in Recess
- Gretchen Klein, a character in The Wilds
- Gretchen Mannkusser, character from Malcolm in the Middle
- Gretchen Morgan, character from Prison Break
- Gretchen Nunn, a character in Golem^{100} by Alfred Bester
- Gretchen Ross, a character from Donnie Darko
- Gretchen Schwartz, character played by Jessica Hecht in Breaking Bad
- Gretchen Wieners, a character played by Lacey Chabert in Mean Girls
- Gretchen Witter, a character from Dawson's Creek
- Kriemhild Gretchen, the witch form of Madoka Kaname, a character from Puella Magi Madoka Magica

== Fictional creatures ==
- Gretchen, a dog in Dark (TV series)
