= Gierach =

Gierach is a surname. Notable people with the surname include:

- Gretchen Gierach, American epidemiologist and women's health researcher
- John Gierach (born 1946), American author and freelance writer

== See also ==
- Gierasch
