= Grete =

- Gender: Female

Origin
- Meaning: pearl

Other names
- Alternative spelling: Grethe
- Derived: Margarethe
- Related names: Greta, Gretchen

Grete or Grethe is a feminine given name, a derivate of Margaret. It is most often used in Scandinavia (not including Sweden), Estonia, and German-speaking Europe.

== People ==
=== Given name ===
==== First name ====
- Grete Berget (1954–2017), Norwegian politician
- Grete De Francesco (1893–1945), German-speaking writer
- Grete Daut (born 2000), Estonian footballer
- Grete Eliassen (born 1986), Norwegian/American freeskier
- Grete Faremo (born 1955), Norwegian politician
- Grete Frederiksen (1918–2007), Danish freestyle swimmer
- Grete Frische (1911–1962), Danish actress, screenwriter and director
- Grete Gaim (born 1993), Estonian biathlete
- Grete Gross, (born 1890), Russian-German commercial artist.
- Grete Heckscher (1901–1987), Danish fencer
- Grete Hermann (1901–1984), German mathematician and philosopher
- Grete Kirkeberg (born 1964), Norwegian long-distance runner
- Grete Knudsen (1940–2023), Norwegian politician
- Grete Kuld (born 1989), Estonian singer, actress and television presenter
- Grete Mogensen, Danish badminton player
- Grete Nordrå (1924–2012), Norwegian actress
- Grete Ingeborg Nykkelmo (born 1961), Norwegian biathlete and cross country skier
- Grete Olsen (1912–2010), Danish fencer
- Grete Paia (born 1995), Estonian singer
- Grete Püvi (born 1982), Estonian dressage rider
- Grete Reinwald (1902–1983), German actress
- Grete Rikko (1908–1998), German-American painter
- Grete Ring (1887–1952), German art dealer
- Grete Šadeiko (born 1993), Estonian heptathlete
- Grete Salomonsen, Norwegian film director
- Grete Scherzer (1932–2007), Austrian classical pianist
- Grete Treier (born 1977), Estonian road bicycle racer
- Grete Waitz (1953–2011), Norwegian marathon runner

Grete Wurm (8 June 1919 Wiesbaden - 28 March 2002 in Stuttgart; legal name: Margarethe Bauer-Wurm) was a German actress

- Grete Zimmer, birth name of Greta Zimmer Friedman (1924–2016), Austrian-born American nurse kissed by a sailor celebrating the end of World War II in an iconic photograph

==== Middle name ====
- Anne Grete Holmsgaard (born 1948), Danish energy expert and politician
- Anne Grete Riise (born 1964), Norwegian diplomat

=== Nickname ===
- Margarete Adler (1896–1990), Austrian swimmer
- Grete Heublein (1908–1997), German shot putter, discus thrower and sprinter
- Grete Mosheim (1905–1986), German actress
- Grete Prytz Kittelsen (1917–2010), Norwegian goldsmith, enamel artist, and designer
- Grete Rosenberg (1896–1979), German freestyle swimmer
- Grete Sultan (1906–2005), German-American pianist
- Grete Tartler (born 1948), Romanian poet, translator and children's author
- Grete Wurm (1919-2002), German actress

== Fictional characters ==
- Grete Minde, main character of the 1977 Austrian-German drama film Grete Minde, portrayed by Katerina Jacob
- Grete Samsa, in Franz Kafka's novella The Metamorphosis

== See also ==
- Crete (disambiguation)
- Greta (disambiguation)
- Gretel (disambiguation)
