= Rikko =

Rikko may refer to:

- Grete Rikko (1908–1998), a German-American painter.
- Mitsubishi G3M (九六式陸上攻撃機, Kyūroku-shiki rikujō kōgeki-ki), a World War II bomber aircraft.
- Mitsubishi G4M (一式陸上攻撃機, 一式陸攻, Ichishiki rikujō kōgeki ki, Isshikirikukō), a World War II bomber aircraft.
- Rikkō Nakamura (中村 立行, 1912–1995), a Japanese photographer.
