= Schils =

Schils is a surname. Notable people with the surname include:

- Gretchen Reydams-Schils (born 1965), American philosopher
- Jozef Schils (1931–2007), Belgian cyclist
- Mathias Schils (born 1993), Belgian footballer
