= Yvonne Mai =

Yvonne Mai may refer to:

- Yvonne Mai-Graham, middle distance runner
- Yvonne Mai (actress), American-German actress
