= Grete Scherzer =

Austrian pianist (1932–2007)

- Grete Scherzer before 1950
- Born: 9 August 1932; Wolfsberg, Carinthia, Austria
- Died: 11 March 2007 (aged 74); Winterbach, Germany
- Education: Kärntner Landeskonservatorium (Carinthian State Conservatory); Academy of Music and Performing Arts in Vienna
- Occupation: Classical pianist
- Years active: 1947–1957
- Known for: Schubert Prize (Geneva 1949)
- Spouse: Rex Raab

Grete Scherzer (9 August 1932 – 11 March 2007) was an Austrian classical pianist who gained international prominence in the late 1940s and early 1950s. A child prodigy, she rose to national fame at age 14 after winning the 1947 Austrian Music Competition, finishing ahead of future notable pianists Jörg Demus, Ingrid Haebler, and Paul Badura-Skoda. Following her success at the 1949 Geneva International Music Competition, she established a prestigious concert and recording career in Great Britain, performing at major venues including Wigmore Hall and the Royal Festival Hall.

A prolific recording artist for the Parlophone label, Scherzer was particularly acclaimed for her interpretations of Mozart, Schubert, Schumann, and Ravel. She was also a pioneer in broadcast media; her performances were frequently featured on the BBC Third Programme, and she was among the first pianists to perform on British television.

In 1957, following her marriage to the British-born anthroposophical architect Rex Raab, Scherzer withdrew from the international concert stage and moved to Germany, where she lived until her death at 74. Interest in her musical legacy was revitalised in 2024 with the remastering and reissue of her early 1950s recordings.

== Early life and education ==
Grete Scherzer was born on 9 August 1932 in Wolfsberg. Although little is known about her parents, they supported her passion for the piano. Scherzer herself recalled, "I've been playing the piano since I was three years old". Her sister Hedi, about seven years older, taught her, aged five, "the notes". While attending the girls' school in Wolfsberg, the headmistress gave her strong support, furthering her musical development. As a result, at age 9, Scherzer was accepted at the Carinthian State Conservatory (Kärntner Landeskonservatorium) at Klagenfurt am Wörthersee, where her piano teacher was Hilde Frodl. Within six months of starting at the conservatory, Scherzer achieved success at "her first public performance with the Klagenfurt City Orchestra". Subsequently, her reputation continued to grow through academic achievements, "student concerts, radio appearances, and a tour with opera singer Emmerich" during and after the wartime period. In 1947, following these accomplishments, the Conservatory recommended her for an upcoming Austrian Music Competition in Vienna, which was established to discover and further promote Austrian talent among "performing" musicians.

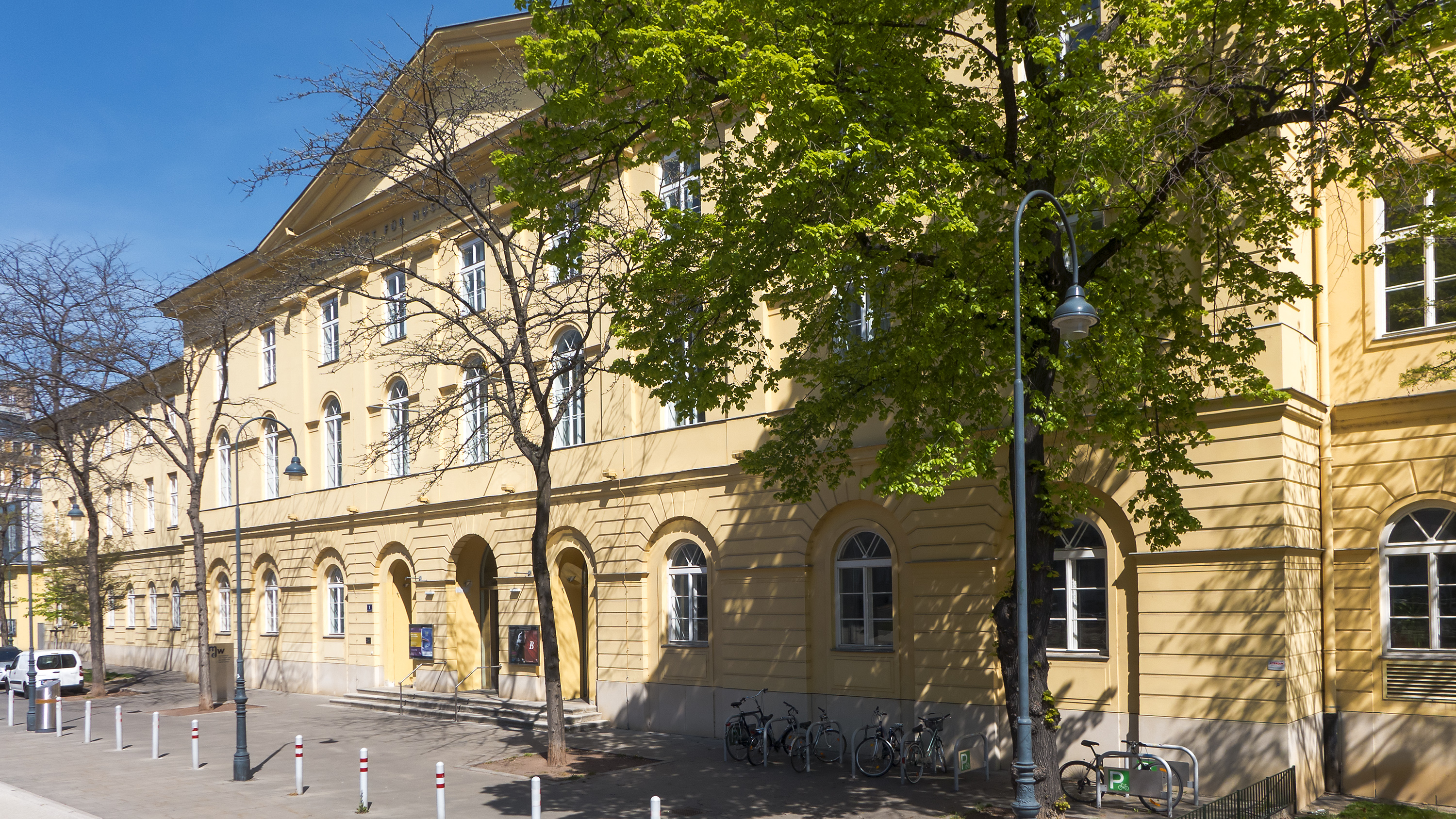
Academy of Music and Performing Arts

At just fourteen, Scherzer won against "competitors Jörg Demus, Ingrid Haebler, and Paul Badura-Skoda" at the 1947 Austrian Music Competition in Vienna, which was chaired by former Music Academy director Joseph Marx. Her interpretation of one of Mozart's concertos during the public final stage in the Great Hall of the Musikverein secured her first prize. Not only did she receive a certificate, but she was also awarded a scholarship from the Gesellschaft der Musikfreunde for postgraduate studies at the Academy of Music and Performing Arts in Vienna in Professor Josef Dichler's class. Just a month later, in July 1947, she again performed as a soloist in Mozart's Piano Concerto No. 23, in Bad Aussee as part of the Austrian Music Students' Festival. Music critics noted her "flawless rhythm and warmest feeling", and described the concert as "one spirited soul" in both the orchestra and the soloist.

== Career ==
=== Austria: Concerts, competitions and awards ===
Scherzer began her master's studies in piano with Professor Josef Dichler in Vienna in February 1948, at the age of 15. Just one year later, "after an audition", she was selected by the "Ministry of Education" to represent Austria at the Schubert Competition in Geneva.

The 1949 Schubert Competition was held as a special event within the Geneva International Music Competition and was dedicated exclusively to Schubert's piano compositions. In the final, Scherzer won over five competitors with her interpretation of the Schubert Sonata in B♭ major, D. 960, winning first prize. Geneva music critics were astonished by Scherzer's youth, but even more so by "the grace of her great talent", characterised by "balance, naturalness, musical expressiveness, elegance, and a fluid touch". Her success was "triumphant", and she was celebrated as "an exceptionally gifted young pianist".

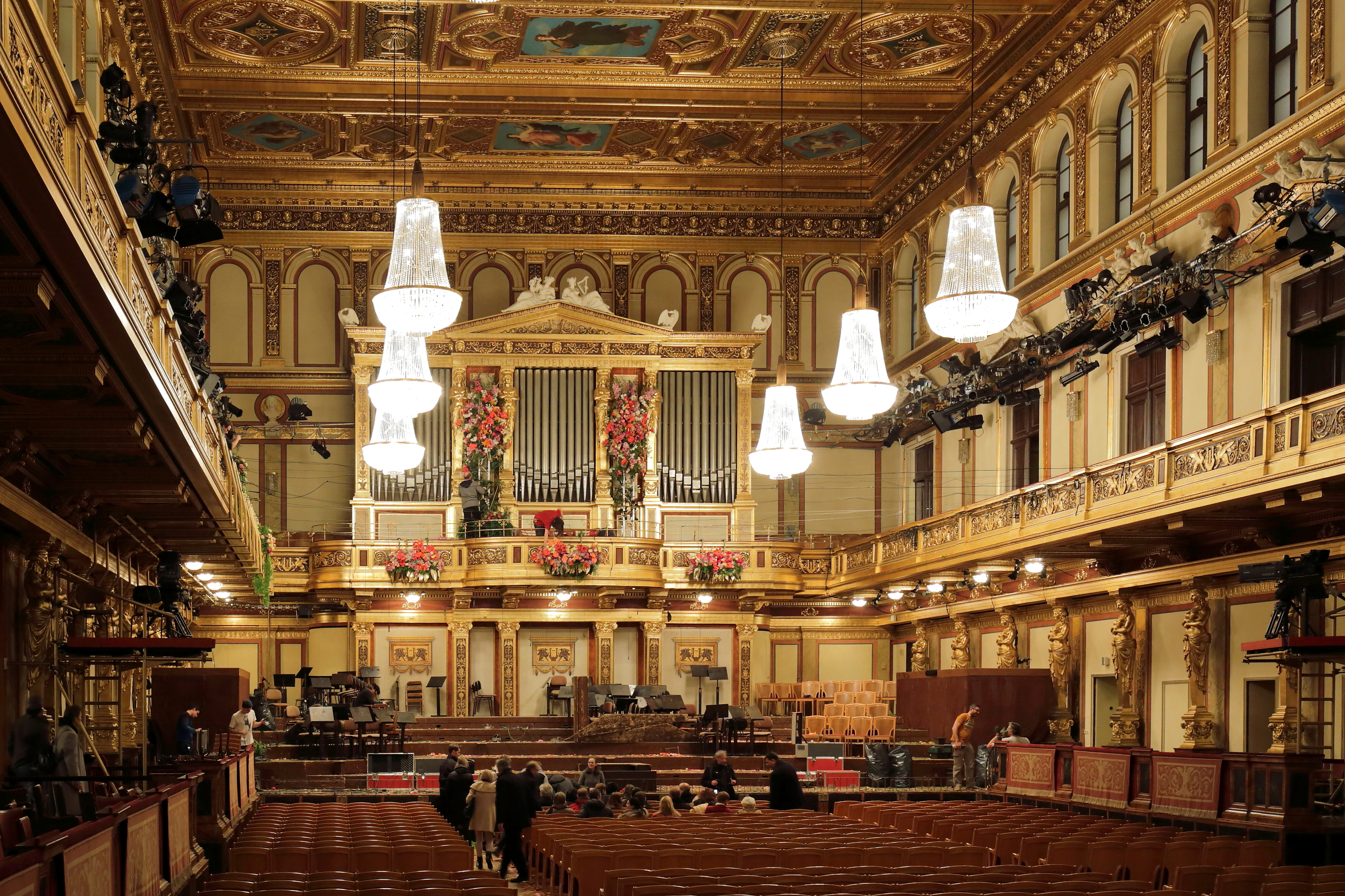
Great Hall of the Musikverein

Scherzer's 1949 Schubert Prize was widely reported in the Austrian press and recognised musically, leading to her nomination as an "Austrian candidate" for the International Chopin Competition in Warsaw, taking place in October 1949. The candidates' concert, held in Vienna on 8 September 1949 and attended by Austrian and Polish officials, was a great success for Scherzer. In the Austria-Musik-Kurier, published by the Gesellschaft der Musikfreunde and the Vienna Concert Hall Society, she was highlighted as the "central figure" that evening. Her "masterful" performance of Chopin's Piano Concerto No. 1, with "refinement of touch" and "polish of melodic lines" – her "remarkable transformation within a few months" was noted. Scherzer was characterised as a young artist who displayed "more than just talent".

This established Scherzer as one of Austria's most sought-after pianists. However, "illness" prevented her from participating in the 1950 Chopin Competition. Despite this setback, Scherzer continued her ascent in 1950, successfully launching her career in Great Britain.

Scherzer's successes in Great Britain, which garnered significant attention in the Austrian media, along with her internationally recognised Schubert Prize and her achievements in Austria, led to her being awarded the "Vienna Critics' Prize for the Promotion of Young Musicians" in 1951.

=== Great Britain: Concerts, radio and television broadcasts ===
In the autumn of 1950, at the age of 17, Scherzer undertook her first tour of Great Britain, travelling on a "six-week work visa".

She made her London concert hall debut on 11 October 1950 at Chelsea Town Hall with a recital featuring works by Bach, Schubert, Schumann, and Chopin. Writing for The Kensington News and West London Times, critic Denby Richards noted that she displayed an "unusual musical maturity for her young age" from "the very first bars of Bach's Chromatic Fantasia and Fugue". Richards further emphasised that this impression was "fully confirmed in Schubert's great posthumously published sonata" (Sonata in B♭ major, D. 960), describing her performance as being among the "most intimate and expressive interpretations" he had ever heard.

Scherzer's BBC broadcast activities that year were limited to two single appearances. Her first radio broadcast took place on 11 September 1950 on the Third Programme, followed by her television debut on 6 October 1950 in the children's programme series For the Children. The latter was announced with the introduction: "Grete Scherzer, seventeen-year-old Viennese pianist, winner of the first award at the International Music Festival, Geneva, 1949, makes her television appearance".

Contemporary press coverage of her first stay in Great Britain often highlighted her appearance alongside her musical successes. She was described as being "Five feet tall, with a halo of fair hair about her face and pigtails hanging down below her waist", with reports remarking that she looked "like a Dresden china figure" in her first elegant evening dress.

==== Establishing a career (1951–1952) ====
In 1951, Scherzer shifted her career focus fully to Great Britain, "embarking on a 2,500-mile tour of the provinces, including the Midlands". In the autumn of that year, she performed successfully at the newly opened Royal Festival Hall, as well as the Wigmore Hall, Wimbledon Town Hall, and Birmingham Town Hall.

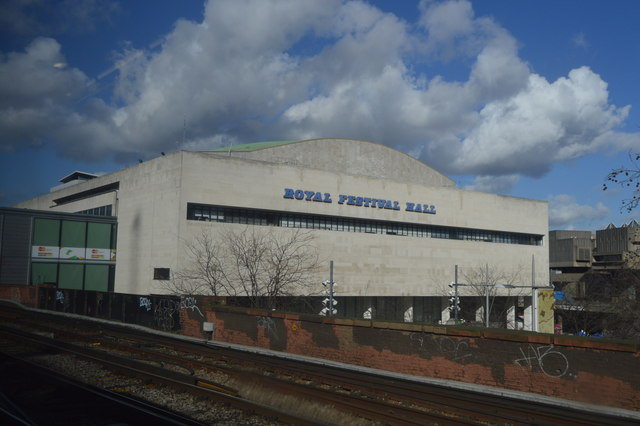
Royal Festival Hall

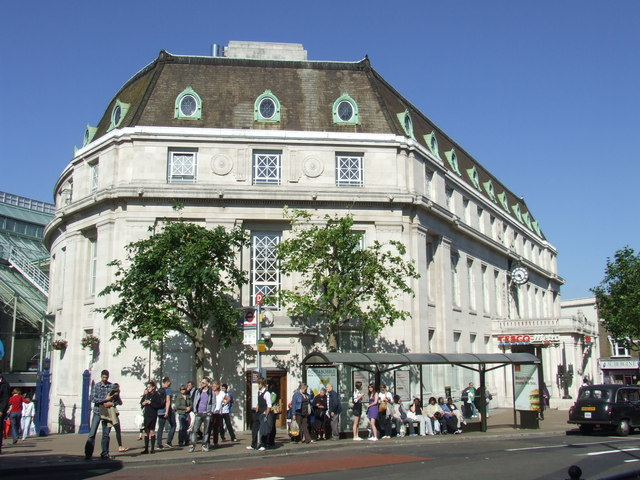
Wimbledon Town Hall

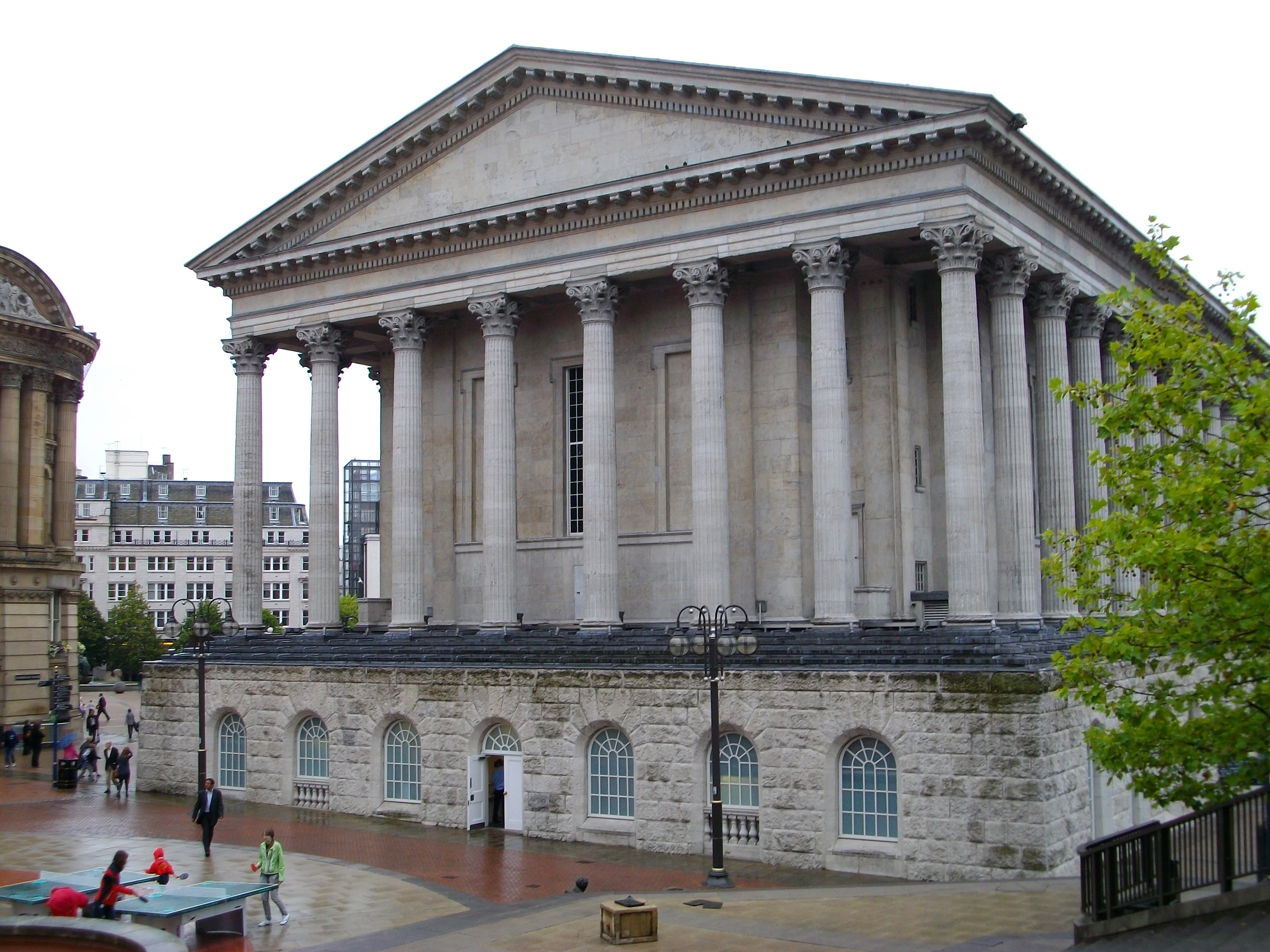
Birmingham Town Hall

At the Royal Festival Hall, she made her first appearance with the London Symphony Orchestra under the baton of Hugo Rignold in September 1951. The music press noted that she performed Schumann's Piano Concerto with "such a mature interpretation and with enough confidence, without a hint of precociousness".

"After her Wigmore Hall recital", she also gave a concert in October 1951 at Wimbledon Town Hall. The program included Chopin's Piano Sonata No. 3, the Toccata in G major, BWV 916, by Bach, arranged by Busoni, and the Brahms Piano Sonata No. 3, a performance "in which she showed her powers to the full". Following a November 1951 recital at Birmingham Town Hall featuring works by Chopin and Ravel, critics wrote that the "gifted pianist's first quality lies in an uncanny understanding of the shape of music: her playing convinces us of the structure of musical thought even when it is lyrical and diffuse". Furthermore, it was noted that Scherzer’s "range has a masculine breadth, yet it is touched with a delicate imagery that is purely feminine".

In the following years, Scherzer fulfilled "engagements with the B.B.C., London Philharmonic Orch., The Parlophone Co. (long and short recordings)" and continued to give regular recitals.

==== Repertoire shifts and later reviews (1953–1957) ====
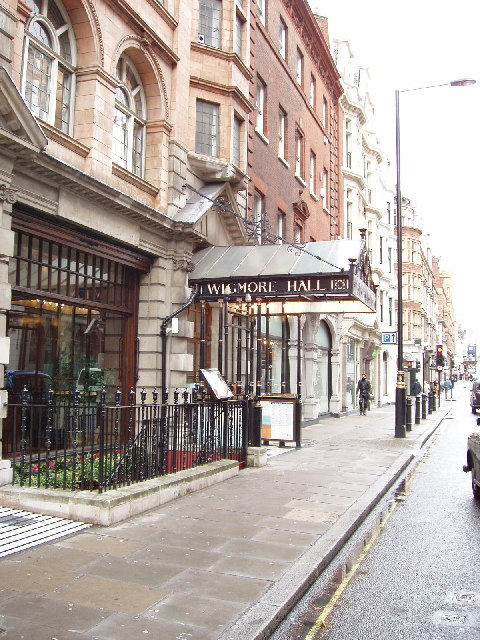
Wigmore Hall

From 1953 onwards, however, increasingly concerned reviews began to appear regarding her performances. Following her rendition of Rachmaninoff's Piano Concerto No. 2 at the Royal Festival Hall in April 1953, it was remarked that "Miss Scherzer, who has been admired for her playing of Schubert and of French music, was unwise to play Rachmaninov". The critic suggested that her small hand span did not allow her "touch ... to the roaring of the klaviertiger".

Scherzer's last known public concert in Great Britain took place at the Wigmore Hall on 12 October 1957. The program included Bach's Chromatic Fantasia and Fugue, Mozart's Piano Sonata No. 10, and Schumann's Humoreske. On this occasion, she faced a more critical perspective on her work. Although the reviewer acknowledged that Scherzer possessed a "pleasing articulation of phrases" and an "exquisitely graded pianissimo touch" ("matters for wonder"), they described her Bach playing as "pompous", though the performance was not "at least ... didactic". Her Mozart was criticised for being "so meticulously refined" that it "emerged dwarf-size", and in the Schumann, the critic claimed, "she drilled into the starch and lace of an old-fashioned governess".

== Recordings ==
In 1950, Scherzer signed with Parlophone. Throughout the early 1950s, the label released numerous recordings of her performing works by composers including Brahms, Chopin, Debussy, Marx, Mendelssohn, Mozart, Prokofiev, Schubert, Schumann, Scarlatti and Ravel. (Note: No single source contained all the recordings; therefore, three reference catalogs from external sources were consulted: + +) Her first release in 1951 featured the Prelude in E♭ minor, from the cycle Six Piano Pieces (1916) by the Austrian composer Joseph Marx. Originally released as a 78 rpm record (R 3437), the performance was later remastered and included in the 2012 Naxos anthology Women at the Piano, Vol. 5 (1923–1955).

Scherzer's last release was Mozart's Piano Concerto No. 14, recorded with the London Baroque Ensemble conducted by Karl Haas. The recording was first released in the United Kingdom in October 1954 (LP PMA 1012). In 1955, it was licensed to Decca Records in the United States (DL 9776). Critical reception of the Mozart recording was mixed. The New York Times critic Ross Parmenter described Scherzer's interpretation as "uninspiring", and DownBeat magazine suggested the performance lacked "vitality". Conversely, the August 1955 issue of The New Records praised her as a "first-rate Mozart interpreter", while Audio magazine described the concerto as being "most gracefully and refreshingly played".

In 2024, the French label Classica re-released some of Scherzer's recordings "from 1952 to 1956 for Parlophone" as part of the "Les Introuvables" (The Lost Treasures) series, Volume 39. The CD was included with issue 259 of Classica magazine in February 2024 and contains her recordings of Schubert's Impromptus, Op. 90, Six moments musicaux, Impromptus, op. 142, Ravel's Gaspard de la nuit and the Schumann Fantasy in C.

French music critic Thomas Deschamps wrote about this reissue of Grete Scherzer's recordings from the 1950s: "Further works by Debussy, including Pour le piano, two sonatas by Scarlatti, piano pieces by Brahms and Chopin, as well as concertos by Haydn and Mozart", which are not included in the 2024 Classica release, "are waiting to be discovered".

== Marriage and life after 1957 ==
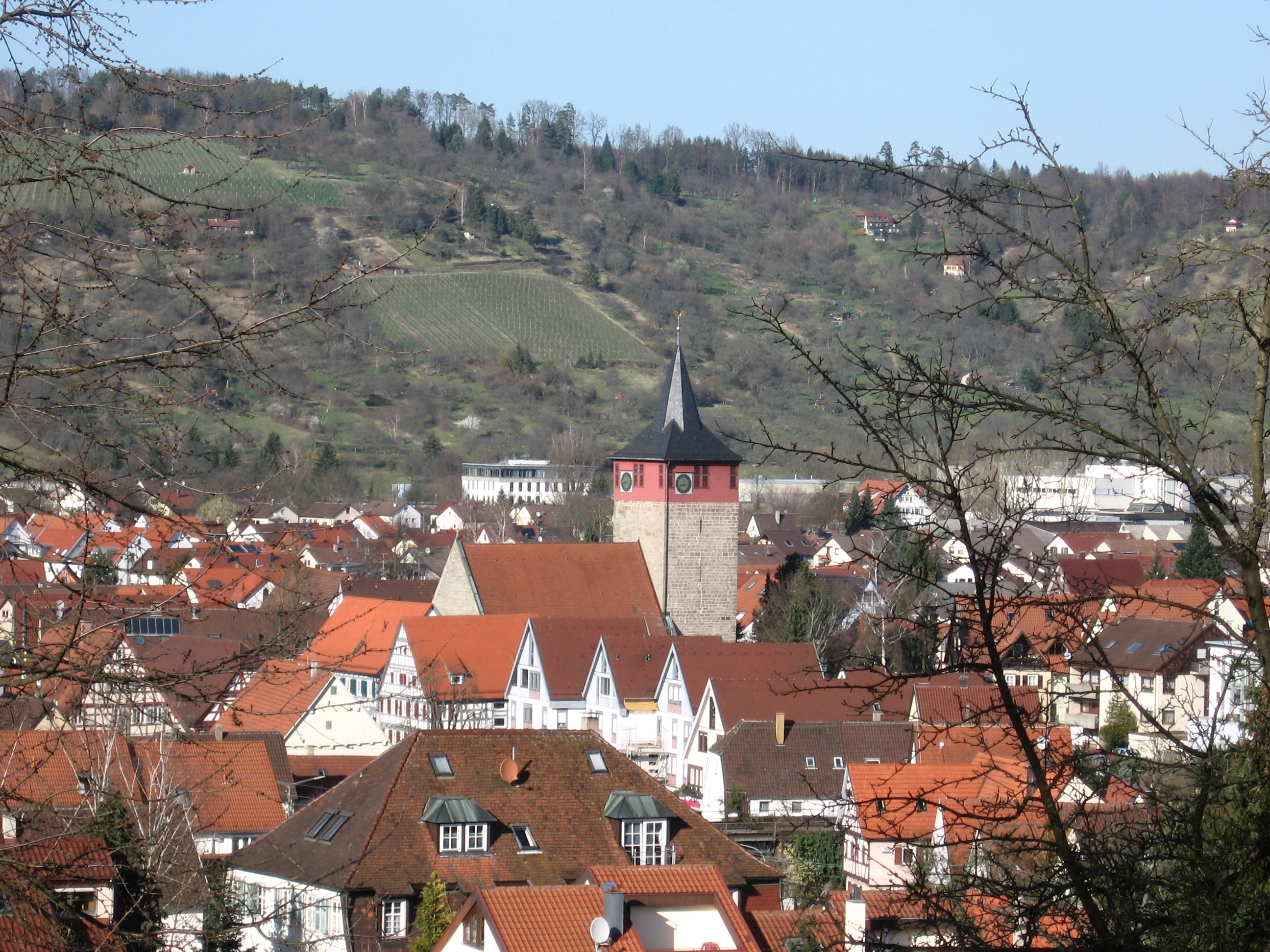
Winterbach

In 1957, Scherzer married the British architect Rex Raab, who had "established his own office in southern Germany" around that time. They had first met c. 1947 when Raab, serving as a "British Red Cross Welfare Officer", worked in her hometown of Wolfsberg for the "Friends' Relief Service". During his time there, Raab organised various educational activities and an "impressive Schubert concert".

Raab had been a member of the Anthroposophical Society since 1938 and was dedicated to the application of Rudolf Steiner's teachings. Following their marriage, Scherzer – then known as Scherzer-Raab – supported his work and withdrew from the public stage and recording studios. (Note: Acknowledgements to Grete Scherzer-Raab from her husband for her active support and collaboration on his projects, see) Why she finally ended her piano career after her last concert at Wigmore Hall on 14 October 1957 – "love, ideological proselytising, social conventions" – remains a "mystery".

Scherzer died in Winterbach, Germany, her chosen long-time residence, on 11 March 2007. (Note: Online excerpt from the German source:)

== Bibliography ==
- "Abschied von Mr. Rex Raab" [Farewell to Mr. Rex Raab]. Lavanttaler Bote (in German): 5. 5 April 1947 – via ANNO. "... und das eindrucksvolle Schubert-Konzert zu verdanken."
- "Au Conservatoire. Le concours Schubert" [At the Conservatory. The Schubert Competition]. Journal de Genève (in French): 6. 25 June 1949 – via Le Temps archives historiques. "Tout d'abord, Mlle Qrete Scherzer (Vienne), dont la jeunesse touche avant même d'avoir joué une note, mais qui. impressionne encore davantage par la grâce d'un talent splendide fait d'équilibre, de nativité, de déclamation musicale, d'élégance et de fluidité dans le toucher. Son succès fut triomphant, et il n'est pas douteux que nous entendrons parler encore de cette jeune pianiste exceptionnellement douée."
- "Britisches Rotes Kreuz" [British Red Cross]. Lavanttaler Bote (in German): 2. 4 January 1947 – via ANNO. "Mr. Rex Raab, Friends' Relief Service, British Red. Cross Welfare Officer"
- "Chopin-Konzert im Großen Musikvereinssaal" [Chopin Concerto in the Great Hall of the Musikverein]. Die Weltpresse (in German): 6. 12 September 1949 – via ANNO. "Die Gesellschaft der Musikfreunde und die Österreichisch-Polnische Gesellschaft veranstalten heute Abend für die österreichischen Teilnehmer am internationalen Pianistenwettbewerb in Warschau (Grete Scherzer, Inge Mayerhofer, Walter Kamper, Friedrich Egger, Eva Wohlmann, Felicitas Karrer, Paul Badura-Skoda) ein Chopin-Konzert."
- "Classics. Mozart". DownBeat: 38. 27 July 1955 – via worldradiohistory.com. ".... although the Concerto No. 14 on the reverse side leaves something to be desired in vitality by the piano performance of Grete Scherzer."
- Deschamps, Thomas (February 2024). "Grete Scherzer, la mystérieuse" [Grete Scherzer, the mysterious]. Classica (in French) (259): 122. "L'année de son mariage avec Rex Raab, elle donne un dernier concert au Wigmore Hall, le 14 octobre ... La vie artistique de Grete Scherzer prend ensuite un tournant plus confidentiel. Amour, prosélytisme idéologique, convention sociale, on ne peut en définir la raison précise. Le mystère reste entier. ... Après les Schubert, Schumann et Ravel que nous rééditons, plusieurs pages de Debussy, dont Pour le piano, deux sonates de Scarlatti, des pièces de Brahms, de Chopin et des concertos de Haydn et de Mozart restent à découvrir."
- "Ein kleines Mädchen mit dem großen Preis" [A little girl with the big prize]. Die Weltpresse (in German): 6. 6 July 1949 – via ANNO. "... übrigens auch das Stipendium von der Gesellschaft der Musikfreunde das ihr ermöglichte, ihre Studien an der Wiener Akademie bei Professor Dichler fortzusetzen. ... und als vor wenigen Wochen das Unterrichtsministerium ein Auswahlspiel abhielt, um die drei Begabtesten für den heutigen Schubert-Wettbewerb nach Genf auszusuchen, war die kleine Grete dabei."
- "Grete Scherzer (1933–2007 Joue Schubert, Ravel et Schumann)". Classica (in French). 24 January 2024. "Enregistré à Londres entre 1952 et 1956, Parlophone. CD «Les Introuvables», vol. 39, Classica n°259"
- "Grete is near greatness". Birmingham Gazette: 4. 20 November 1951 – via Newspapers.com. "This gifted pianist's first quality lies in an uncanny understanding of the shape of music: her playing convinces us of the structure of musical thought even when it is lyrical and diffuse. Her dynamic range has a masculine breadth, yet it is touched with a delicate imagery that is purely feminine."
- "Grete Scherzer recital". The Kensington News and West London Times: 3. 26 October 1951 – via Newspapers.com. "After her Wigmore Hall recital, Grete Scherzer gave another London recital this season at the Wimbledon Town Hall, in which she showed her powers to the full."
- "Kärntner Pianistin in England erfolgreich" [Carinthian pianist successful in England]. Das kleine Volksblatt: 9. 14 December 1950 – via ANNO.
- "Kandidatenkonzert für den Chopin-Wettbewerb Warschau" [Candidates' Concert for the Chopin Competition Warsaw]. Austria-Musik-Kurier (in German). Gesellschaft der Musikfreunde und der Wiener Konzerthaus-Gesellschaft: 39. 1949 – via Google Books. "Der Mittelpunkt des Konzertes aber bildete die ... jugendliche Grete Scherzer (Klasse Dr. Dichler). Welch ein Wandel innerhalb weniger Monate. Wie hat sich der Anschlag gerundet, wie durchgeführt ist heute schon die melodische Linie. ... Die Meisterung des Klavierkonzertes E-Moll von Chopin in dieser Form war eine Leistung. ... Hier wächst ein junger Mensch heran, der mehr in sich trägt als bloß ein Talent."
- "Kultur, Theater und Musik". Linzer Volksblatt (in German): 2. 24 July 1947 – via Arcanum Zeitungen. "Man kann es ein Erlebnis nennen, Grete Scherzer vom Konservatorium Klagenfurt als Solistin in Mozarts Konzert für Klavier und Orchester A-Dur K. V. 488 zu hören. Tadelloser Rhythmus und wärmste Empfindung, Orchester und Solistin eine beschwingte Seele."
- "Kunst und Künstler. Erste Preisträger im Musikwettbewerb ermittelt" [Art and artists. First prize winners in the music competition have been determined]. Wiener Kurier (in German): 3. 13 June 1947 – via ANNO. "Klagenfurt hat mit der 14jährigen Pianistin Grete Scherzer ein vielversprechendes Talent zu dem Wettbewerb gesandt. Das junge Mädchen wird am Sonntag im öffentlichen Schlußkonzert im Großen Musikvereinssaal gemeinsam mit Jörg Demus, Ingrid Haebler und Paul Badura-Skoda um den Preis streiten."
- Lim, Lemy Sungyoun (September 2010). "The Reception of Women Pianists in London, 1950–60" (PDF). City, University of London Institutional Repository. 1: 347 – via City Research Online. "Although Scherzer possessed 'pleasing articulation of phrases' and had an 'exquisitely graded pianissimo touch' ('matters for wonder'), her Mozart was 'so meticulously refined' that it 'emerged dwarf-size'. In the Schumann, 'she drilled into the starch and lace of an old-fashioned governess'. Her Bach was 'pompous' though the performance was not 'at least... didactic.'"
- Lim, Lemy Sungyoun (September 2010). "The Reception of Women Pianists in London, 1950–60" (PDF). City, University of London Institutional Repository. 1: 329 – via City Research Online. "'Miss Scherzer, who has been admired for her playing of Schubert and of French music, was unwise to play Rachmaninov, because her hands do not fall comfortably on the big piano writing, because her touch does not lend itself to the roaring of the klaviertiger.'"
- "Music with pigtails". Birmingham Gazette: 3. 20 November 1951 – via Newspapers.com. "I have been playing the piano since I was three years old. It is hard work. Very hard work. A concert exhausts me."
- Parmenter, Ross (19 June 1955). "Masonic Music: Three Mozart Cantatas Recorded by Epic". The New York Times: 15. ISSN 0362-4331. "... or there is little inspiration in Grete Scherzer's performance of the E flat Major Piano Concerto ..."
- "Pianist in plaits grows up". Birmingham Gazette: 4. 8 October 1952 – via Newspapers.com. "While in this country last year, she made a 2,500-mile tour of the provinces, including the Midlands ..."
- "Porträt der Woche" [Portrait of the Week]. Lavanttaler Bote (in German): 3. 22 September 1950 – via ANNO. "Hedi .... Damals selbst noch ein Kind, machte sie die fünfjährige Grete mit den Tasten und Noten bekannt ... Frau Direktor Wittmann übernahm dann die weitere Ausbildung. Nachdem die Eltern der kleinen Grete das außergewöhnliche Talent erkannten und das notwendig, keine Opfer scheuende Verständnis dafür aufbrachten, kam sie mit 9 Jahren an das Konservatorium nach Klagenfurt. Frau Professor Frodl war dort ihre Lehrerin. Ein halbes Jahr später hatte sie bei ihrem ersten öffentlichen Auftreten mit dem Städtischen Orchester Klagenfurt sofort einen großen Erfolg. Bei Schülerkonzerten, Rundfunkübertragungen und einer Tournee mit dem Kammersänger Emmerich wurde man immer mehr auf die kleine Grete aufmerksam."
- "Porträt der Woche" [Portrait of the Week]. Lavanttaler Bote (in German): 3. 22 September 1950 – via ANNO. "Wie hoch man Grete Scherzer und ihr Können einschätzt, beweist die Tatsache, daß man ihr sechs Wochen Arbeitserlaubnis erteilt hat. Bisher waren es nur immer einige Tage, die ausländischen Künstlern zur Verfügung standen ... Professor Dr. Dichler ist seit Februar 1948 – seit dieser Zeit besucht sie die Musikakademie bis auf den heutigen Tag und wird sie auch in Zukunft besuchen — ihr Lehrer, von dem sie mit Begeisterung spricht. ... Auch am Chopin-Wettbewerb in Warschau hätte sie gern teilgenommen, war aber leider durch Krankheit verhindert."
- "Preis der Wiener Kritik" [Critics' Prize]. Salzburger Nachrichten (in German): 6. 4 September 1951 – via Arcanum Zeitungen. "Das Preisrichterkollegium, das aus den Musikreferenten der Wiener Presse gebildet wurde, hat folgende Künstler für die Zuerkennung der Preise vorgeschlagen: Klavier: Grete Scherzer ... zuerkannt."
- "Friday, October 6". Radio Times (1406): 45. 1950 – via BBC Genome Project. "Grete Scherzer, a seventeen-year-old Viennese pianist, winner of the first award at the International Music Festival, Geneva, 1949, makes her television appearance."
- Raab, Rex (1993). Edith Maryon: Bildhauerin und Mitarbeiterin Rudolf Steiners eine Biographie mit zahlreichen Abbildungen und Dokumenten [Edith Maryon: Sculptor and collaborator of Rudolf Steiner – a biography with numerous illustrations and documents]. Pioniere der Anthroposophie (in German). Dornach: Philosophisch-Anthroposophischer Verlag am Goetheanum. pp. 399–400. ISBN 978-3-7235-0648-6. "Und ohne meine Frau, Grete Scherzer-Raab, wäre das Buch kaum in Angriff genommen worden. Sie war es, die die Zeichen der Zeit las und vor vier Jahren das Stichwort zum Beginnen gab. Zwar lagen ausgedehnte Forschungsergebnisse vor. Erst als es ans Formulieren ging, wurde jedoch ersichtlich, was noch fehlte, so daß fortan Forschen und ... ihr unschätzbaren Beitrag ..."
- "Records" (PDF). Audio): 50. September 1955 – via worldradiohistory.com. "... the piano concerto is not only lovely but most gracefully and refreshingly played. Excellent."
- Richards, Denby (20 October 1950). "Music review by Kensington News music critic Denby Richards". The Kensington News and West London Times: 5 – via Newspapers.com. "From the opening bars of Bach's Chromatic Fantasia and Fugue, Miss Scherzer showed herself in possession of a musical maturity unusual in one so young, and this impression was amply justified in the Schubert Posthumous Sonata, the performance of which was one of the most intimate and expressive I have ever heard."
- "Royal Festival Hall". The Kensington News and West London Times: 2. 28 September 1951 – via Newspapers.com. "... it was extraordinary to see a young, unsophisticated girl with long plaits over her shoulders come onto the platform and play this difficult concerto with such a mature interpretation and with enough confidence without a hint of precociousness."
- Schafarschik, Walter (29 June 2007). "Grete Scherzer-Raab". Philosophisch-Anthroposophischer Verlag am Goetheanum. 26 – via Anthroposophische Gesellschaft in Deutschland e. V. "Grete Scherzer-Raab, 9. August 1932 bis 11. März 2007"
- Sharp, Dennis (15 April 2004). "Rex Raab". The Independent: 35 – via Newspapers.com. "Raab was 40 years old when he established his own office in southern Germany, beginning a life as a busy practitioner with a small staff and many commissions and consultancies. ... Rex Raab, architect and teacher: born London, 7 April 1914; married 1957 Grete Scherzer; died Stuttgart, Germany, 19 March 2004."
- Smith, H. Royer (March 1955). "Mozart: Concerto No. 14 in E-flat, K. 449". The New Records. 23: 81 – via Internet Archive. "Miss Scherzer turns out to be a first-rate Mozart stylist too, ..."
- "The greatest of young pianists. Grete Scherzer". The Daily Telegraph: 3. 4 October 1952 – via Newspapers.com. "The Greatest of Young Pianists, Grete Scherzer. Here to fulfil engagements with the B.B.C., London Philharmonic Orch., The Parlophone Co. (long and short recordings), and to give recitals."
- "The pianist in pigtails brings one concert dress". Evening Standard: 5. 6 September 1950 – via Newspapers.com. "Five feet tall, with a halo of fair hair about her face and pigtails hanging down below her waist ..."
- "Third Programme: Schubert, 11 September 1950". BBC Genome Project.
- "Viennese schoolgirl's English debut". Chelsea News: 4. 20 October 1950 – via Newspapers.com. "Looking like a Dresden china figure in her first grown-up evening gown, 17-year-old Grete Scherzer, the pigtailed Viennese pianist ... she gave a one-woman recital that included works by Bach, Schubert, Schumann, and Chopin, and an enthusiastic audience accorded her half a dozen curtain calls at the end."
- "Wieder Wiener Musikwettbewerb" [Vienna Music Competition again]. Österreichische Zeitung: 5. 22 March 1947 – via ANNO. "Die Gesellschaft der Musikfreunde in Wien hat für Juni dieses Jahres die Abhaltung eines Musikwettbewerbes für schaffende und reproduzierende Künstler angekündigt, dessen Aufgabe die Förderung ... und die Unterstützung junger, aufstrebender Talente sein soll ... Sichtung und Auswahl des hochbegabten österreichischen Nachwuchses ..."
- "Women at the piano – an anthology of historic performances, Vol. 5 (1923–1955)". Naxos. September 1912.

== External sources and further readings ==
- "BBC program index for Grete Scherzer, sorted by first broadcast". BBC Genome Project.
- For Grete Scherzer's recording chronology, see Johansson, Christian. "Grete Scherzer". Classical Pianists.
- "CHARM – King's College London: Simple search for Grete Scherzer". CHARM – via King's College London.
- "Parlophone recordings (selection) by Grete Scherzer for listening". Parlophone – via Internet Archive.
- Piano education of Scherzer's sister, Hedi Scherzer: "Ablegung der Staatsprüfung" [Taking the state examination]. Lavanttaler Bote (in German): 3. 4 June 1948 – via ANNO. "An der Musikakademie legte Hauptschullehrerin Hedi Scherzer die Staatsprüfung in Klavier und am Landeskonservatorium die Prüfung „künstlerische Reife" mit sehr gutem Erfolg ab. Hedi Scherzer ist eine Schülerin der bekannten Konzertpianistin Frau Grete Lorweg. (Hedi Scherzer, a secondary school teacher, passed the state examination in piano at the Academy of Music and the "artistic maturity" examination at the Carinthian Conservatory with very good results. Hedi Scherzer is a student of the renowned concert pianist Grete Lorweg."
- "Sound and Moving Image Catalogue: Simple search for Grete Scherzer". British Library.
