= The Last Faust =

Film by Philipp Humm

- Theatrical release poster
- Directed by: Philipp Humm; Dominik Wieschermann
- Screenplay by: Philipp Humm; Ellen Elkin
- Based on: Faust by Johann Wolfgang von Goethe
- Produced by: Philipp Humm; Daniele Mah
- Starring: Steven Berkoff; Martin Hancock; Glyn Dilley; Edwin De La Renta; Yvonne Mai
- Cinematography: Dominik Wieschermann
- Edited by: Dominik Wieschermann
- Music by: Florian Siegmund
- Release date: 2 December 2019
- Running time: 108 minutes
- Country: United Kingdom
- Language: English

The Last Faust is a 2019 feature art film written and directed by the German artist Philipp Humm. Set in 2059, it is a contemporary interpretation of Johann Wolfgang von Goethe's 1808 Faust and the first film directly based on both parts of the tragedy. It stars English actors Steven Berkoff (Dr. Goodfellow) and, Martin Hancock (Faust). Its music is based on Richard Wagner with tracks from Swiss electronic music duo Yello.

The film is part of a bigger project with the same name - The Last Faust, it is Humm's Gesamtkunstwerk (total works of art) and "entails more than 150 artworks including a feature artfilm, an illustrated novella and collections of drawings, sculptures, fine art photographs and paintings."

== Plot ==
It is 2059 and Tech CEO Dr. Goodfellow is hiding in the townhouse of his late mother. The house is safe as it is not connected to the AI-neural network, a creation of Goodfellow, which is now on the verge of eliminating the human race. Goodfellow is accompanied by his latest creation, an advanced android, Paris, to whom Goodfellow tells the story of his predecessor, Faust.

The story begins with God and Devil (Mephisto) making a bet, over a game of chess. God, believing in humankind, says that Mephisto cannot corrupt Dr. Faust, a faithful scientist, and CEO of Winestone Inc, a Silicon Valley company. Mephisto disagrees and thus visits Faust on Earth, first disguised as a poodle and then as a hedge fund manager. His attempts are successful, Faust's desire to emulate God and create a superhuman is so strong that he agrees to exchange his soul for unlimited access to knowledge.

However, Mephisto, the mischievous devil, tricks Faust and exposes him to carnal lust instead of giving him access to so greatly desired knowledge. Deceived by the Devil, Faust falls in love with 16-year-old Gretchen, a love story ending with her tragic death, the death of her and Faust's child, and the death of her mother and brother.

Unperturbed by this tragedy, Faust, still full of carnal lust, demands to meet Helen of Troy, the most beautiful woman ever known, who he had seen in a vision. Faust, Mephisto, and Homunculus, the AI-robot created by Faust, travel back in time 4000 years and end up in Greek mythology. Faust finds and marries Helen which leads to the birth of a child named Euphorion. With another turn in tragic events, Euphorion dies and Helen disappears.

Faust, grieving and all alone, is finally freed from the shackles of his lust. He joins forces with Mephisto and time travels back to help his reigning Emperor win a war. Following their victory Faust is granted an estate. He shifts his focus towards regaining land from the sea and enjoying his life as a capitalist. On his deathbed, Faust writes a Manifesto of an egalitarian society, later compared to the Communist Manifesto. After Faust's death, his soul is resurrected and reunited with Gretchen, pointing to the strange moral standards of the catholic church.

As Dr. Goodfellow finishes the story of Faust, Paris stops recording and sends it off into cyberspace where it is safely stored in a time capsule for future generations to discover. In the meantime, the AI-neural network finds Goodfellow's hide-out indicating the end of mankind.

== Cast ==
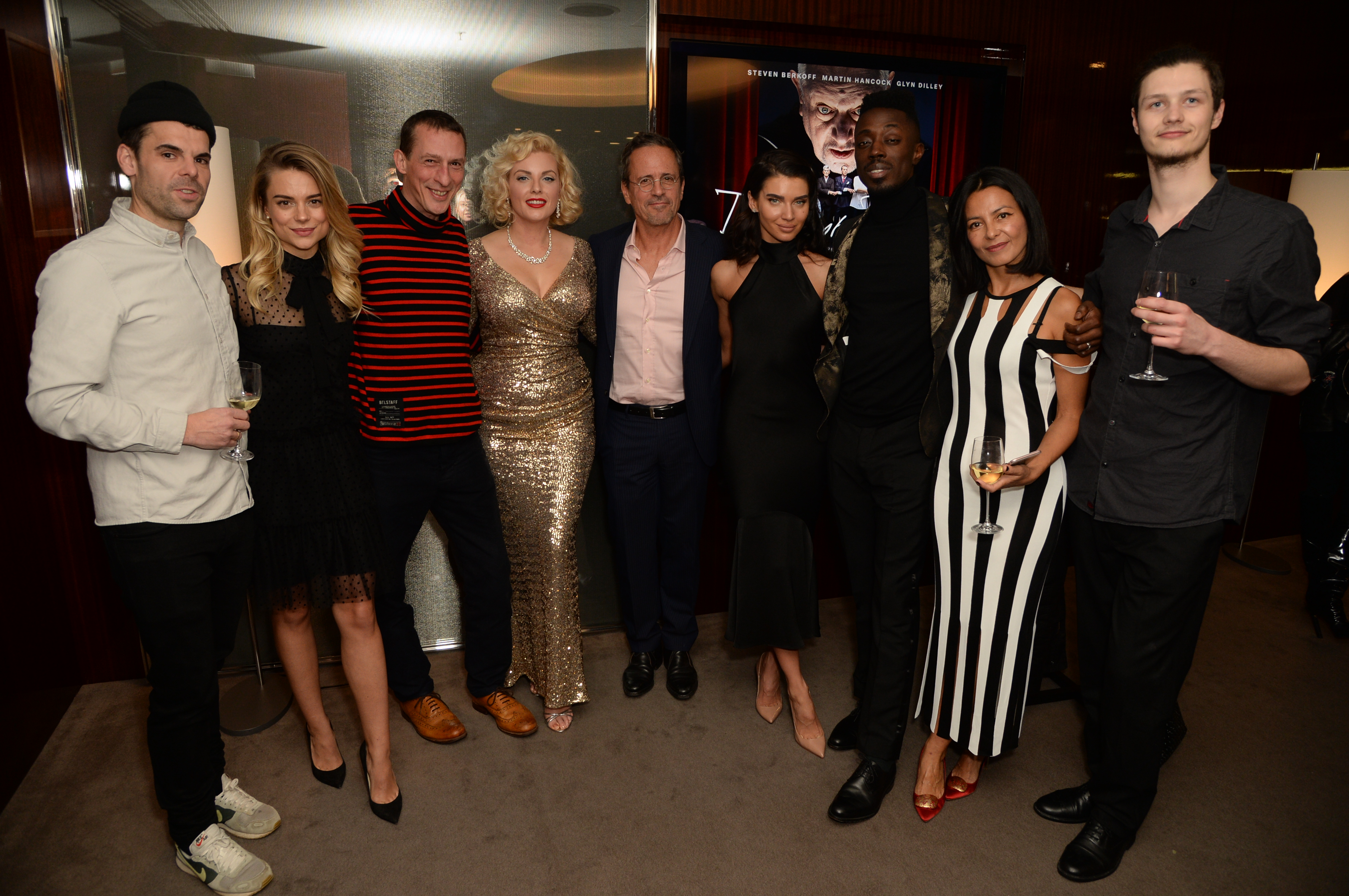
The Last Faust Cast during the film premiere in Bulgari hotel. From left to right: director Dominik Wieschermann, actress Yvonne Mai, actor Martin Hancock, actress Isabella Bliss, director/producer Philipp Humm, actress Scarlett Melish Wilson, actor Edwin De La Renta, producer Daniele Mah, production manager Linas Stanzys.

- Steven Berkoff as Dr. Goodfellow, Faust's successor. He narrates the story of Faust. Goodfellow stands for Silicon Valley, where unshackled technological progress like AI endangers humanity. The role, played by British theatre and film veteran Steven Berkoff, is inspired by Charles Gray, who played the narrator in The Rocky Horror Picture Show. Berkoff inspired by The Last Faust went on to produce Harvey, a one-man West End show, written and performed by the actor.
- Martin Hancock as Dr. Faust, scientist and CEO of Winestone Inc., a high-tech company from Silicon Valley. A tragic character, genius with little empathy and who temporarily succumbs to his lust. An early version of Harvey Weinstein. Christoph Waltz was used as a casting reference.
- Glyn Dilley as Mephisto, the devil who likes to trick humans and enjoys a good prank. He appears first as a poodle and later as his true earthly self - a hedge fund manager. The actor Ben Kingsley was used as a casting reference.
- Yvonne Mai as Gretchen, a beautiful 16-year old receptionist of Winestone Inc. who falls for the company's CEO Dr. Faust. Gretchen Is a victim, who sometimes is a perpetrator as well.
- Scarlett Mellish Wilson as Helen, the most beautiful woman ever, daughter of Zeus and Leda. Abducted by Paris in Greek mythology and by Dr Faust in Goethe's Faust.
- Isabella Bliss as Angel, who protects Dr. Faust to ensure that God's bet with Mephisto can be carried out without fail. Anna Nicole Smith was used as a casting reference.
- Edwin De La Renta as Homunculus and Paris - the Superhuman. Edwin plays the AI-robot Homunculus, created by Dr. Faust, and Paris, a more evolved AI-robot created by Dr Goodfellow. To make a statement Humm chose to cast a black actor, give him blue contact lenses and dye his hair blond in stark contrast to how the character would be portrayed in the original story.

== Production ==
=== Development ===
The film was part of a bigger project – Humm's Gesamtkunstwerk (also called The Last Faust), a total works of art with over 150 artworks, including an illustrated novella, and a collection of fine-art photos, sculptures, pencil drawings, and paintings. Originally, Humm envisioned to only produce a fine-art photo collection. It then evolved organically to a full-length feature film.

The film's script is made of two parts:

- The core script telling the story of Dr. Faust. Humm used the English translation by Martin Greenberg of the original text from Wolfgang von Goethe's Faust, which Humm edited and shortened. The script was structured in 37 chapters or scenes, which Humm felt were the most relevant.
- A narrator script, which guides the viewer through the 37 scenes and tells the story of Faust's successor - Dr. Goodfellow. This part was written by Philipp Humm and Ellen Elkin.

The scenes were visualized by Humm into 37 large scale pencil drawings, which later became the storyboard for the film and a foundation for the fine-art photos.

=== Filming and design ===
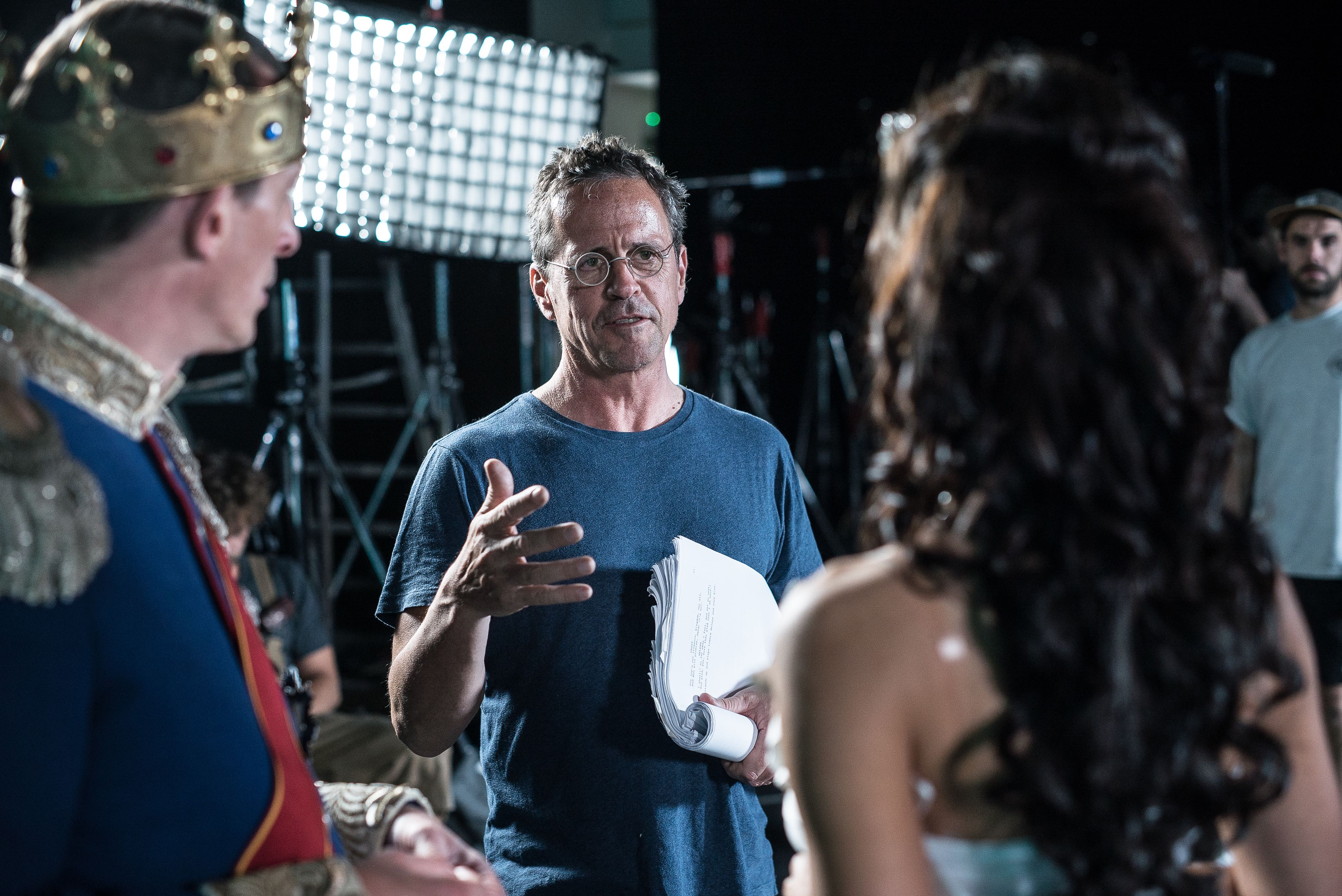
Philipp Humm giving directions to actors: Martin Hancock (left) and Scarlett Melish Wilson (right)

Following the structure of the script, the film was shot in two parts over 20 days with three days of rehearsals.

The core part of the film was shot over 15 days in June 2018 in parallel with the fine-art photo production. The crew used two adjacent studios at Park Royal Studio’s, London. On average the team produced 2.5 film and 2.5 photo scenes per day - it was regarded as an intense production. The locations, being primarily photography tailored, were not fully sound proof and the film team had to work around external noise issues, ice cream vans in particular were a funny nuisance. To make such an intense production schedule possible, Humm reverted to projections and lights with few iconic, theatrical props, instead of extensive set-building. The team set up a massive projection screen at the rear of the film studio giving the movie a strong sense of a theatrical performance. Humm was inspired by the projections and light designs crafted by Robert Wilson.

Rehearsal and fittings with actors and dancers spanned across two weeks and four days.

To begin filming the second part of the script, in August 2018 Humm recruited Ellen Elkin to rework the narrator text that he had written. Meanwhile, Daniele Mah recruited and cast Steven Berkoff to play Dr Goodfellow. The remaining film and photo productions took place in a luxurious heritage townhouse at Lordship Park 89, London. It took five days and finished in September 2018.

The film was shot on Blackmagic URSA Minipro with Hanse Inno Tech Celere HS, and a P&S anamorph zoom 35-70mm lenses. Aspect ratio 1.78/1 and 2.35/1.

=== Post-production and music ===
Post-production of the film took place in Germany and started in October 2018. Dominic Wieschermann worked closely with Humm over three weeks to edit the film while fine-art photos using the photos taken by Mah and Griffiths in the studio were transformed by Humm working with John Fox, a London-based CGI artist. The post-production process for the movie took four months.

The music in The Last Faust is inspired by Richard Wagner's piano tracks and was composed and produced by Florian Siegmund / HAUS Building Sound. Remaining music sequences, such as Yello songs, and sound effects were recorded and mixed by Felix Sievert / Concord Audio in his Hamburg studio.

== Themes ==
=== Artificial Intelligence ===
Dr. Goodfellow succeeded Dr. Faust as CEO and Chief Scientist of Winestone Inc. Under his leadership, the Silicon Valley Company developed an AI-powered neural network to which all humans and things were deeply connected. The creation of the network was made possible with quantum computing, which gave the processing power required for self-learning intelligence. The network did good for humanity and the planet. However, one day it concluded that its creators, the humans were detrimental to Earth and decided to eliminate them.

Dr. Goodfellow underestimated the risks of unleashed technological progress. With technologies like AI, mankind has developed weapons which will be uncontrollable. Mankind's future will depend on the goodwill of machines.

“Futurologists all agree on one basic premise, our human brains are still firmly lodged in the Stone Age, machines are unencumbered by hunger or cold, the constant push for efficiency will consign us to the scrap heap, and it’s unlikely that machine historians will even mention us. We’ll be phased out of the collective memory much in the same way that the Americas began with Columbus, modern history, in The Last Faust at least will begin in 2059”

=== Harvey Weinstein and #metoo ===
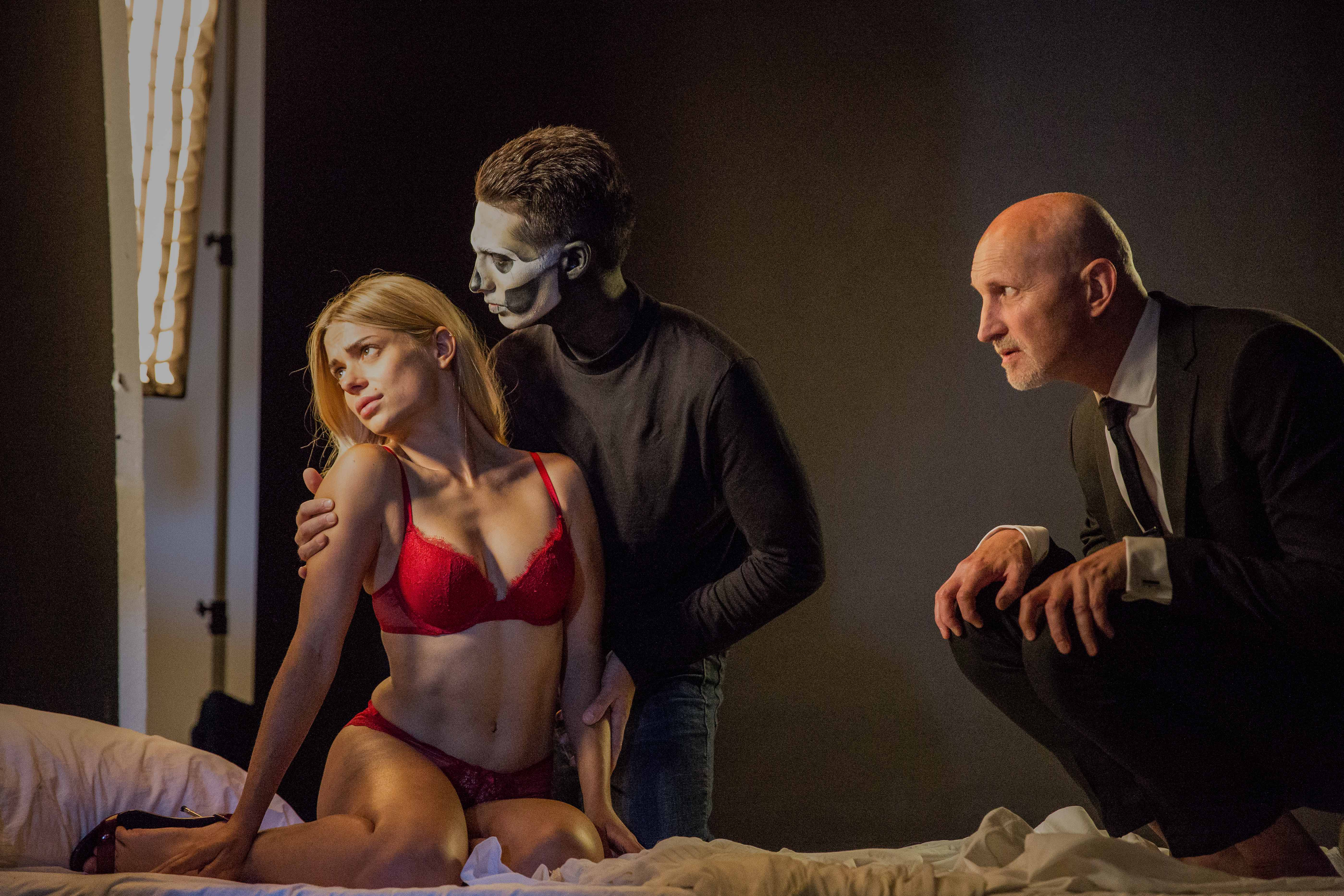
Fatal attraction... from left, Yvi Mai as Gretchen, Martin Hancock as Faust and Glyn Dilley as Mephistopheles.

Part 1 of Goethe's Faust is the love story of an old Dr. Faust falling in love with a 14-year-old girl of luminous beauty Gretchen. Faust entered a pact with the Devil Mephisto to access the keys to God's creation. Mephisto tricked him and instead gave him carnal lust, the unrestrained desire for young flesh. Faust uses his position of power and the Devil's powers to seduce Gretchen. The love story ends tragically with Gretchen's, her child's, her mother's and her brother's deaths.

Vladimir Nabokov’s protagonist Humbert Humbert follows a similar fate, obsessed by adolescent Lolita, his justification for seduction is the worship of youth. Harvey Weinstein resembles Faust, yet differs as he consumed sexual relationships. He stood atop a Hollywood empire. He was also a sexual predator, weaponizing his position to abuse and coerce young actresses.

In Goethe’s world, Faust is a redeemable monster. Faust soul gets called to paradise in the last act of the play in an act of mercy by Gretchen. Before this, Gretchen is thrown into jail and executed for infanticide of Faust's child out of wedlock. Goethe was a jury member in a similar case and approved the death penalty for a young girl who gave birth outside of wedlock and later killed the child. Women were unfairly treated for childbirth outside of wedlock while their seducers were able to escape; an injustice Goethe represented through the Gretchen tragedy.

=== Catholic Church’s ethics ===
One could argue that the Catholic Church made Faust possible, in particular, the dark sides of Faust. Heinrich Heine said that Faust was the beginning of a critical attitude to religion/church and the beginning of the scientific era. The “Faustische” is not only the pact between Mephisto (Experience) and Faust (Knowledge) but it also the bet between God (Good) and Mephisto (Evil). As God cannot lose a bet– otherwise God would be fallible - God accepts the poor ethical choices Faust makes throughout his life as long as Faust continues to strive for the truth.

The Church finances a counter Emperor when the Pope realizes that the acting Emperor deteriorates the economy, thus reducing Church tax incomes. When the Emperor wins the war with the help of Mephisto and Faust, the Church again gets its share in the form of land and taxes. The Church derives its power from its right to name the Emperor and from its material wealth. Goethe references the creation of the Holy Roman Empire in the 13th century where the four princes electors (Saxon, Bavarian, Swabian, and Frank) and the archbishop of Mainz were electing the Emperor, who would then receive the Papal coronation. Goethe was possibly also referencing 1815 (Congress of Vienna), when the feudal system and the feudal rights of the Church, abolished 1803, were reinstated temporarily until 1848, after Goethe's death.

=== Goethe and Draghi/Greenspan ===
Faust takes the role of Plutus the King of Wealth in a carnival-like game procession at the Emperor's court. He announces to the Emperor the wealth to come. Mephisto becomes his central banker. Mephisto introduces paper money to replace gold-based currency. This has to be understood in the historical context of Goethe's time. In 1716 John Law, a Scottish Banker, tried to eliminate the state deficit by introducing paper money. The attempt failed in 1720, but the paper money was there to stay as it got facilitated by newly created banks. In Faust, the failing economy quickly - temporarily - recovers. However, as spending was financed by printing more money, the state deficit grew on the verge of strangulating the economy, which led to the Pope sponsoring a counter Emperor to overthrow the incompetent acting Emperor. While the government failed economically, many influential courtesans paid off their debt with paper and amassed wealth. The modern asset-based capitalism was born.

== Release ==
Film was released on December 2, 2019, as a VOD on online streaming platforms and later as a DVD.

=== Reception ===
Stuart Jeffries wrote in The Guardian that "Certainly, Humm’s adaptation tackles sexual harassment, artificial intelligence, the troubling ethical ramifications of technological innovation, the stuff of a million comment pieces." and Stewart Clarke in Variety noted that the presented topics speak "to the modern relevance of Goethe's interpretation of the German legend". Review by Suzi Feay from Financial Times was featured as a 'pick of the week' and described the movie as outlandish and grandiose, while Jo Good referred to it as "something you absolutely cannot miss" on BBC Radio London interview.

The Last Faust received positive critical reviews on Rotten Tomatoes. Dylan Andersen from Film Threat, scored the film 8 out of 10 and stated "Be you a patron of the theatre, a long-time fan of Goethe, or simply seeking an introduction to the story of Faust, this movie satiates all. Even the casual observer will have a good time with this film". Rich Cline, Rotten Tomatoes critic writing for Shadows on the Wall, rated the film 3 out of 5 and wrote that "Humm and codirector-cinematographer Wieschermann created a staggering variety of vivid tableaux to depict this story, and the film arrives accompanied with paintings, photography, sculptures and a novella. In other words, this feels more like a museum piece than a movie, designed to tease and confront the viewer rather than to recount a coherent story with empathetic characters. Yes, it's very difficult, but Humm's purely bonkers approach is dazzling".

Britflicks's Jane Foster praised The Last Faust "if Art house and Faust are your thing, or you’re a fan of Steven Berkoff, The Last Faust, is for you...with such strong performances, this is a piece worth a look for that alone" and Liselotte Vanophem from OC movie reviews said that "There’s absolutely no denying that “The Last Faust” was made with immense passion, dedication, and craftsmanship. The result will not be loved by everyone but it's still a very peculiar, unique, beautiful and expressive movie". Wendy Attwell from Set the Tape gave the movie 3 out of 5 stars and wrote "It’s a fascinating interpretation, and one that no doubt will be foist upon students of literature and theatre for years to come, confusing as much as enlightening them". A similar review with a rating of 5 out of 10 came from The Spinning Image's Graeme Clark who wrote "The screenwriter and director here, Philipp Humm, was one who put his stamp on it in the style of video artists, a strain of modern art that adopted the latest technology to craft its imagery and put across its themes".

The film also got attention from the German press. Ulrich Bierman in the radio interview for Deutschlandfunk said that the movie is a total work of art, and Hans-Georg Rodek from national newspaper Die Welt praised Philipp Humm for the use of expressionistic backdrops and doing what no director has dared to do yet.
