= Martin Hancock =

English actor

- Born: 10 January 1970 (age 56); Fulham, London, England
- Occupation: Actor
- Known for: Coronation Street (1997–2001, 2003, 2022–2023)

Martin Hancock (born 10 January 1970) is an English actor best known for his roles as Geoffrey "Spider" Nugent in the English soap Coronation Street (between 1997 and 2003 and again between 2022 and 2023) and as Reg Lund in Holby City.

== Early life ==
Hancock was born on 10 January 1970 in Fulham to an English father and a New Zealand mother. He attended Drayton Manor High School in West London and trained at the Drama Centre London.

== Career ==
Hancock has had roles in a number of English television series, including BBC's This Life and the ITV1 cult drama Demons. He has also had film roles in 24 Hour Party People, Chasing Liberty (2004), Kingdom of Heaven (2005) and Defiance (2008), as well as in a number of theatre productions.

However, his most famous role remains that of Emily Bishop's eco-warrior nephew, Geoffrey "Spider" Nugent, in the long-running ITV soap Coronation Street. Hancock left the show as a regular in 2000, feeling that his character of Spider had run its course.

It was announced in May 2022, that Hancock is to return to the programme and reprise the role of Spider in July 2022.

In 2007, he appeared as himself on an episode of Celebrity MasterChef.

And more recently he played paramedic Indies father in Casualty on 30 March 2025.

== Personal life ==
He lives in London with his wife, and is a supporter of West Ham United F.C.

== Filmography ==
=== Film ===
| Year | Title | Role | Notes |
|---|---|---|---|
| 2000 | Liam | David | |
| 2002 | 24 Hour Party People | Howard Devoto | |
| 2004 | Chasing Liberty | McGruff | |
| 2004 | Trauma | Emery Jones | |
| 2005 | Kingdom of Heaven | Gravedigger | |
| 2005 | Hell to Pay | Martin | Direct-to-video |
| 2005 | The Best Man | Stan | |
| 2006 | Rabbit Fever | Bill Johnson | |
| 2007 | Hannibal Rising | Polygraph Operator | |
| 2008 | Defiance | Peretz Shorshaty | |
| 2011 | Screwed | Bowers | |
| 2011 | 7 Lives | Beggar | |
| 2013 | The Physician | Merlin | |
| 2014 | Closer to the Moon | Prosecutor | |
| 2014 | Hoodies vs. Hooligans | DC Meyler | |
| 2015 | Rough and Ready | Nick | |
| 2016 | Brakes | Mark | |
| 2016 | Blaze of Gory | Terry | |
| 2017 | 6 Days | Bill | |
| 2019 | The Car: Road to Revenge | Talen | |
| 2019 | The Last Faust | Dr. Faust | |

=== Television ===
| Year | Title | Role | Notes |
|---|---|---|---|
| 1993–2007 | The Bill | Various roles | 3 episodes |
| 1994, 2015 | Casualty | Mike Levin / Sam McGann | 2 episodes |
| 1995 | Wycliffe | Dave | Episode: "Lost Contact" |
| 1997 | This Life | Philip Becks | Episode: "Guess Who's Coming to Dinner?" |
| 1997 | London's Burning | Rick | Episode #10.6 |
| 1997–2001, 2003, 2022–2023 | Coronation Street | Spider Nugent | 190 episodes |
| 1998 | Our Mutual Friend | Sloppy | 3 episodes |
| 2000 | Daddyfox | Nick Fry | Television film |
| 2002 | Crime and Punishment | Koch | Television film |
| 2002–2014 | Doctors | Various roles | 4 episodes |
| 2003 | Keen Eddie | Fishy | 2 episodes |
| 2004 | Top Buzzer | Barbara | Episode: "Drought" |
| 2005 | Born and Bred | Jimmy Ingram | Episode: "A Wrathful God" |
| 2005 | Totally Frank | Phil | Episode: "Debt" |
| 2005 | Line of Fire: The Somme | Andrews | Television film |
| 2005–2006 | Holby City | Reg Lund | 18 episodes |
| 2006 | No Angels | Graham | Episode #3.6 |
| 2006 | Children in Need | Reg Lund | Episode #1.27 |
| 2008 | M.I. High | Charlie Chuckworth | Episode: "Face Off" |
| 2009 | Demons | Redlip | Episode: "They Bite" |
| 2009 | History's Hardest Prison | Thomas Bambridge | Television film |
| 2009 | Terror! Robespierre and the French Revolution | Collot | Television film |
| 2010 | Little Crackers | Mr. Fix It | Episode: "Car Park Babylon" |
| 2012 | Crime Stories | Mathew Boyle | Episode #1.9 |
| 2013 | Being Human | Leader | Episode: "Sticks and Rope" |
| 2014 | The Musketeers | Jailer | Episode: "The Good Soldier" |
| 2014 | Endeavour | 'Nosey' Parker | Episode: "Neverland" |
| 2014 | Chasing Shadows | Eamonn Thirsk | Episode: "Off Radar: Part 2" |
| 2015 | The Enfield Haunting | Tony Watson | Episode #1.2 |
| 2015 | Cradle to Grave | Soapy | 6 episodes |
| 2020 | In the Long Run | Trevor | Episode #3.1 |
| 2025 | Casualty | Samuel Jankowski | Recurring role |
| 2026 | Industry | Dez Watkins | 2 episodes |
