= Gretchenfrage =

Meaning and uses of the English term "Gretchen question" / "Gretchenfrage"

A Gretchen question or Gretchenfrage (from German: Gretchenfrage, pronounced [ˈɡʁeːtçənˌfʁaːɡə], with Gretchen, diminutive for Margarete, and Frage, question in English) is a crucial, difficult, "unpleasant, sometimes embarrassing, and at the same time essential question for a certain decision, which is asked in a difficult situation." It is studied in literature and the philosophy of religion. In philosophy and linguistics, it is a type of question, alongside rhetorical, loaded, leading and misleading questions, and other question types.

It is a type of crucial question that goes to the heart of the matter and requires the interlocutor to provide a direct answer, often revealing intimate or compromising beliefs of the person asked.

== Background ==
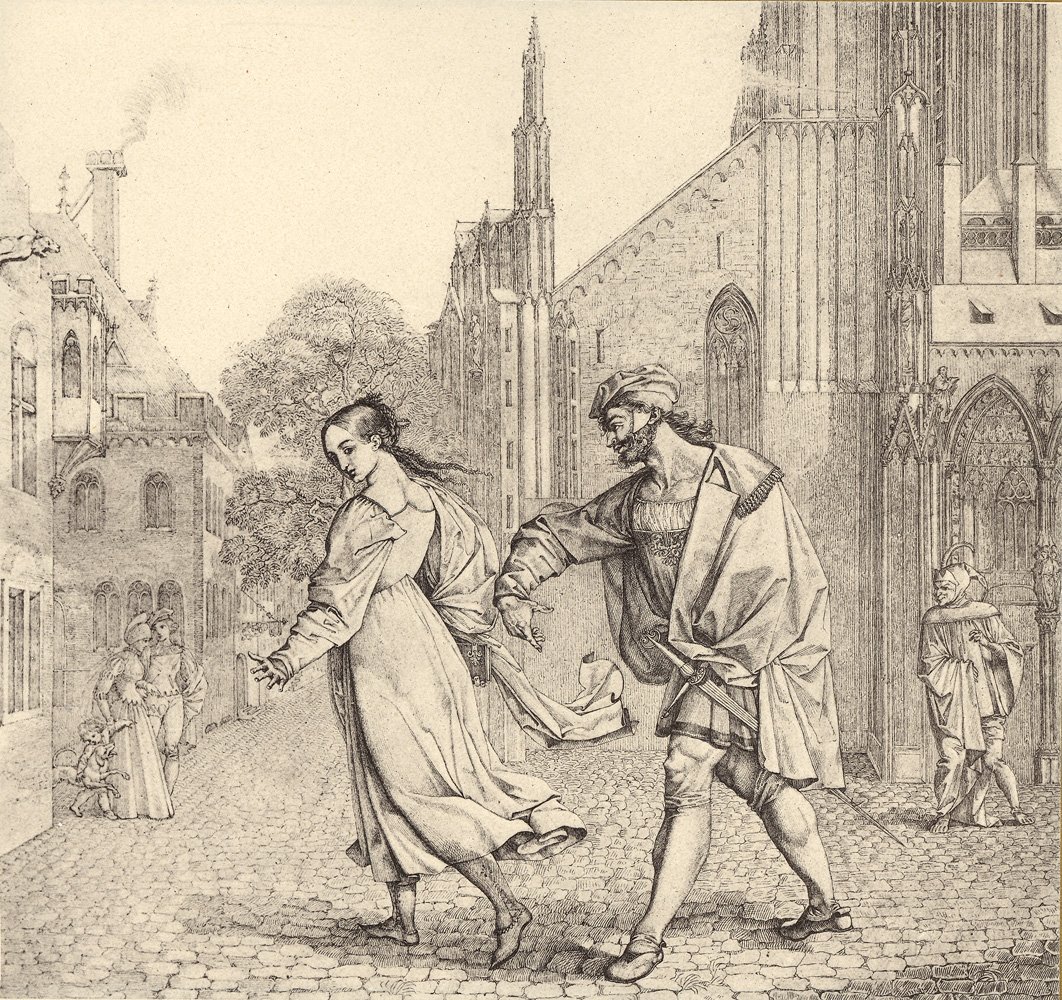
"Mein schönes Fräulein, darf ich wagen, meinen Arm und Geleit Ihr anzutragen?" – "Bin weder Fräulein, weder schön, kann ungeleitet nach Hause gehn." Faust bietet Gretchen den Arm, von Peter von Cornelius (1811)

The question comes from Johann Wolfgang von Goethe's tragedy Faust, Part I (English, original German), where the main character, Faust, seeks knowledge, power and freedom, makes a pact with the devil (Mephistopheles), and in the course of the story meets Margarete, a young maiden, and seduces her with help from the devil.

The question appears in scene XVI, In Martha's Garden, after Margarete has been seduced by Faust, but has doubts about him and asks:

Now tell me, what do you think about religion?
You are a kind, good man,
but I don't think you make much of it.

— Goethe, Faust I

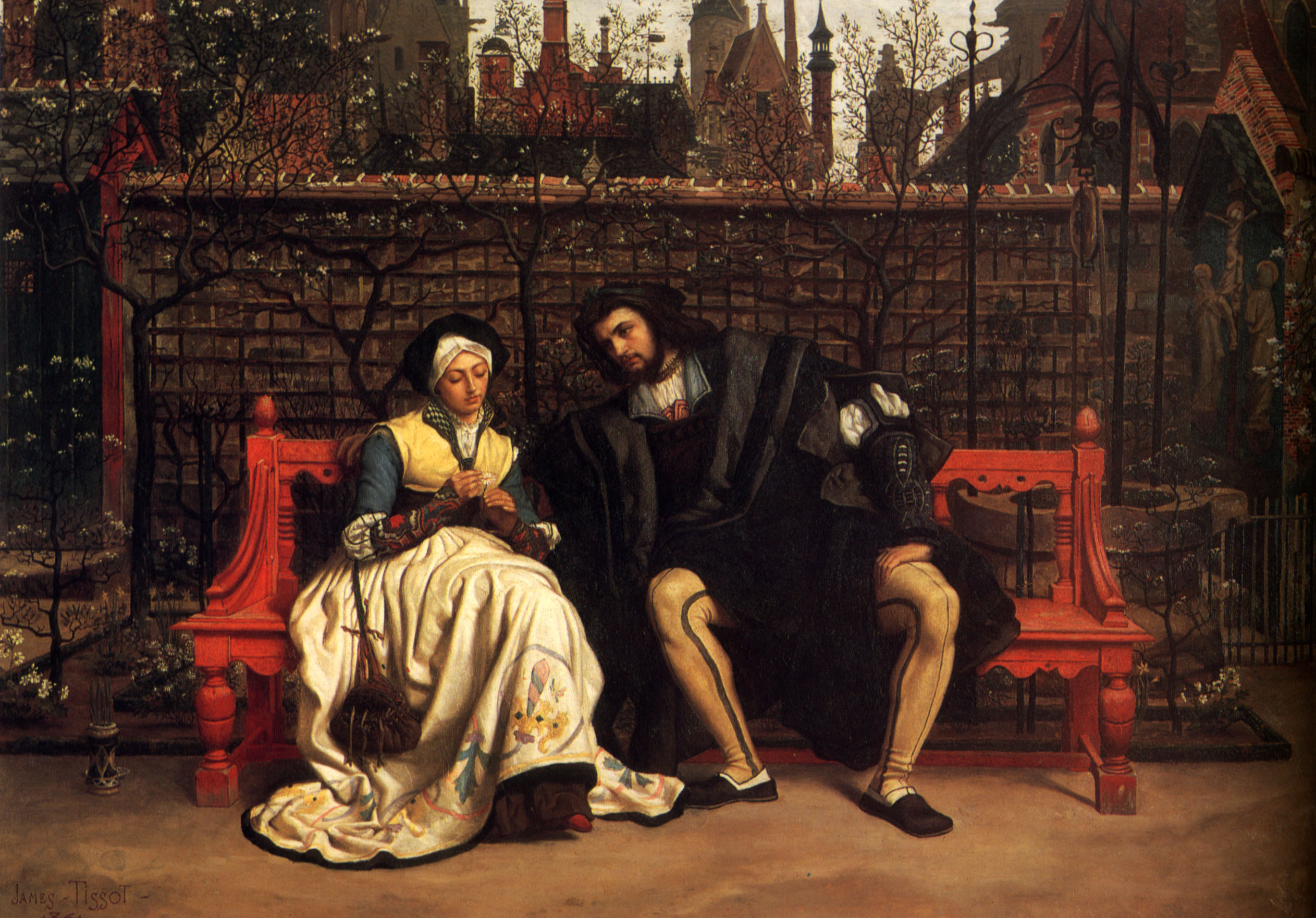
Faust and Gretchen in Martha's Garden (painting by James Tissot , 1861)

In the German original:

Nun sag', wie hast du's mit der Religion?
Du bist ein herzlich guter Mann,
Allein ich glaub', du hältst nicht viel davon.

— Goethe, Faust I, 3415

Leading up to the question, the despair and infatuation of the young maiden is felt in the previous scene of the play, In Gretchen's room, where she, lost in her thoughts labors at the spinning wheel. The piece was set to music by Franz Schubert in a much acclaimed German Lied, Gretchen am Spinnrade.

Faust, a learned man older than her, however, does not answer the question and replies:

Leave that, my child! Thou know'st my love is tender;
For love, my blood and life would I surrender,
And as for Faith and Church, I grant to each his own.

My darling, who shall dare
'I believe in God!' to say?
Ask priest or sage the answer to declare,
And it will seem a mocking play,
A sarcasm on the asker.

Thus Faust evades the question, and pushes back instead asking what exactly Margarete is looking for, whether she is asking about his faith or his adherence to tradition. Margarete, under-age and not a learned woman, and who doesn't know that Faust has a pact with the devil, finally gives up, leading to disastrous consequences for her.

== First use of "Gretchenfrage" ==
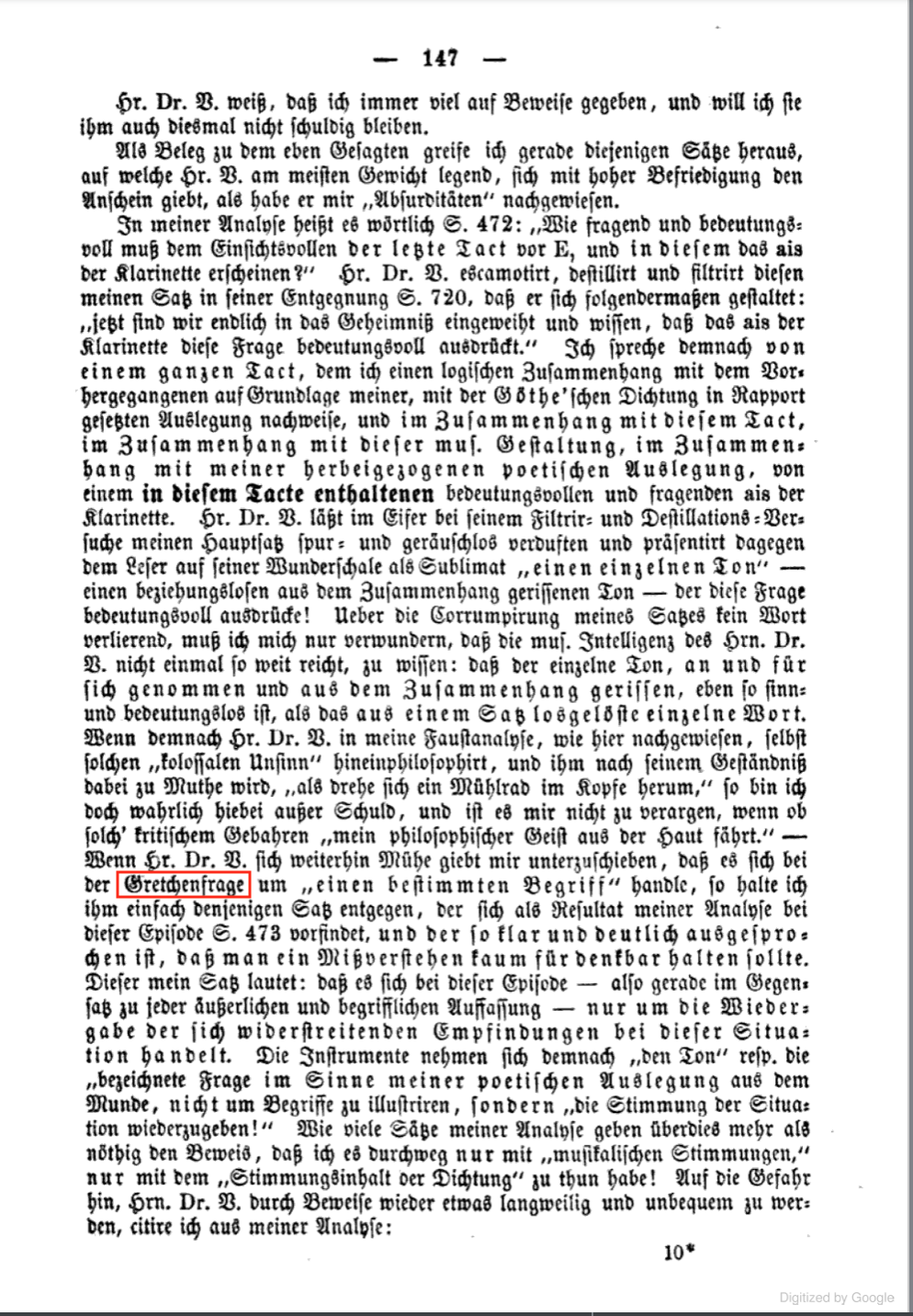
Gretchenfrage, coined in the Schlesische Provinzialblätter, issue 1168, p. 147, 1865

Goethe's tragedy Faust, Part I, was first published in German in 1808, with English translations as early as 1840.

The term Gretchenfrage was coined almost sixty years later, in 1865, in the Schlesische Provinzialblätter, a Silesian provincial publication from the mid-19th century.

Max Planck, the physicist, asks the Gretchen question during a lecture in 1937, without resorting to the Gretchenfrage term:

"'Tell me: how do you stand on religion?' — If Goethe's Faust contains at all a simple phrase that captivates even a sophisticated listener and arouses a hidden tension within him, it must be this worried question of an innocent girl, in fear for her newly-found happiness, to her lover whom she recognizes as a higher authority."

In contemporary German language use, it is not an infrequent term. A search for the term on the Austrian newspaper Wiener Zeitung shows 216 results.

== Uses of "Gretchen question" ==
A Gretchen question is a term for a direct question that goes straight to the heart of a problem and is intended to reveal the intentions or attitude of the person being asked. It can therefore be unpleasant or compromising for the person being asked because it may be hard to answer, and it forces them to explain themselves, admitting to beliefs they are not ready to admit.

While originating in Goethe's tragedy, any question requiring a straight answer is now considered a Gretchen question and may still carry a religious connotation.

Austrian philosopher Konrad Paul Liessmann proposes at Philosophicum Lech that, in a narrow sense, a Gretchen question is a question about religion or the religiosity of the person or social group being addressed, as in Goethe's play, in Martha's Garden, where Gretchen wants to know if Faust is a Christian with good morals.

In a broader sense, questions with the explicit or implicit question structure "Tell me, what do you think about ...[a given topic X] " are also referred to as Gretchen questions.

Outside the context of Goethe's tragedy, the term Gretchen question refers to a "free lexeme." A Gretchen question is not only recognizable by the fact that it is explicitly referred to as such; the syntactical structure and introductory formula of the original question are often imitated. For example: [...] that the Socialist Party [of France] is asked the same crucial question from the left and the right: "What do you think of the Communists? " , headline from the Swiss newspaper Neue Zürcher Zeitung, cited by Burger et al..

== Related pages ==
- Question
- Gretchen, proper name
- Faust, play by Goethe
- Goethe, Faust, Part One
- Johann Wolfgang von Goethe
- Faust character
- Gretchenfrage, German Wikipedia page
- Wiktionary: Gretchenfrage (https://en.wiktionary.org/wiki/Gretchenfrage)
- Wiktionary: Gretchenfrage, German (https://de.wiktionary.org/wiki/Gretchenfrage)
