= Gretchen Hofmann =

Gretchen Hofmann is professor of ecological physiology of marine organisms at the University of California, Santa Barbara. She holds a B.S. from the University of Wyoming, and an M.S. and Ph.D. from the University of Colorado at Boulder in Environmental, Population and Organismal Biology.

She works on the ecological physiology of marine organisms, in particular kelp, invertebrates and perciform fishes. Hofman's work on the effects of changing seawater acidity and temperature on marine life has drawn wide attention.

Hofmann told The Times of India that as marine invertebrates deal with increasing acidity, the larvae have to "re-tune" their metabolism in order to still make a shell. "But this is done at a cost. The physiological changes that are a response to the acidity make the animals less able to withstand warmer waters, and they are smaller," which causes "catastrophic" problems on up the food chain as larger organisms fail to get enough food

In 2006, Reuters followed her to Antarctica where she drilled through the ice to explore the impact of warming global temperatures on fish. She explained that "“If we learn how the most cold-adapted organisms -- the organisms that are most used to cold and no temperature change -- how they respond, we might learn something about the processes in temperate species, figuring out what pathways to look at that might be changing -- or might not be changing.”

== Publications ==
Sea Urchin Genome Sequencing Consortium (2006) The Genome of the Purple Sea Urchin Strongylocentrotus purpuratus. Science 314: 941-952.

Lund, S.G and G.E. Hofmann (2006) Turning up the heat: the effects of thermal acclimation on the kinetics of HSF1 DNA-binding activity and Hsp70 gene expression in the eurythermal goby, Gillichthys mirabilis. Comparative Physiology A 143: 435-446.

Osovitz, C.J. and G.E. Hofmann (2005) Thermal-history dependent expression of the hsp70 gene in the purple sea urchins: Biogeographic patterns and the effect of thermal acclimation. J. Exp. Mar. Biol. Ecol. 327: 134-143.

Hofmann, G.E., J.L. Burnaford and K.T. Fielman (2005) Genomics-fueled approaches to current challenges in marine ecology. Trends Ecol. Evol. 20(6): 305-311
