= Gretchen Garber Billings =

American journalist

- Born: Gretchen Garber; November 19, 1914; Whitefish, Montana
- Died: February 23, 1999; King, Washington
- Citizenship: United States
- Occupation: Journalist
- Employers: The People's Voice; Montana Rural Electric Cooperatives Association
- Known for: Editor of The People's Voice, progressive advocacy

Gretchen Garber Billings (1914–1999) was a journalist and advocate for cooperative causes who co-owned and -operated a newspaper called The People's Voice in Helena, Montana.

== Early life ==
Gretchen Garber was born in Whitefish, Montana in 1914 but was raised in the Seattle area. She spent summers in Montana with her grandparents to lessen the impact of her chronic lung disease and moved to Montana permanently after World War II.

== Journalism career ==
In 1948, Billings joined the staff of The People's Voice, an independent, politically progressive newspaper in Helena, Montana. In the same year, she took on the position of managing editor in conjunction with her husband, Harry. In 1968, their co-worker Bennett Hansen took over the editor position in 1968. The Billingses resigned from the paper following "a lengthy dispute with organized labor over support of the Vietnam War."

In particular, Billings' friendly and open style of writing allowed the Voice to reach a wider audience. She was known for her willingness to work across the divide with more conservative politicians and businessmen.

== Later work ==
Billings left the newspaper in 1968 following years of physical and mental stress brought on by the job. In particular, she and her family received threats against their home in the 1950s for her progressive writing during the Red Scare. She continued working, serving as a secretary to a local carpenter's union. She also worked with other cooperative causes and served as the executive director of the Montana Rural Electric Cooperatives Association.

== Personal life ==
On October 11, 1933, Gretchen married Harry Leroy Billings. The couple had three children together: John, Mike and Leon.

== Awards and recognition ==
Billings was inducted into the Montana Newspaper Hall of Fame in 2007.

== Later years ==
The Billingses retired to their home in Thompson Falls in the 1980s and moved to Apache Junction, Arizona after Harry developed respiratory problems. He died on April 23, 1990. Gretchen Billings died on February 23, 1999, in King, Washington.
