= Gretchen Dykstra =

American businesswoman

Gretchen Dykstra (born NY August 22, 1948) was the founding President and CEO of the National 9/11 Memorial and Museum Foundation, Commissioner of the New York City Department of Consumer Affairs under Mayor Bloomberg, and the founding president of the Times Square Business Improvement District (now the Alliance) throughout the 90s. Trained as a teacher, Dykstra worked at the Rockefeller Foundation, the NYC Charter Revision Commission, and the Edna McConnell Clark Foundation. She taught English in Wuhan, China for 2 years in 1979-1981.

Dykstra currently writes full-time. Her first book, Pinery Boys: Songs and Songcatching in the Lumberjack Era, (University of Wisconsin Press, 2017) was a team effort with James P. Leary, pre-eminent folklorist, to re-issue the classic Songs and Ballads of the Shanty Boy (Harvard, 1926), written by her grandfather, Franz Rickaby. It includes new material, an introduction by Leary, and a biography written by Dykstra. Her book Civic Pioneers: Local Stories of a Changing America, 1895-1915, was released in the spring of 2019.

== Publications ==
- Pinery Boys: Songs and Songcatching in the Lumberjack Era, University of Wisconsin Press, 2017.
- Civic Pioneers: Local Stories of a Changing America, 1895-1915, 2019.
- Echoes from Wuhan, Atmosphere Press, 2022 (ISBN 9781639882151).
- Lessons from the Foothills, University Press of Kentucky, 2024 (ISBN 9781985900691).
