= Gretchen Peters (journalist) =

American journalist and advisor

- Education: Harvard University (AB); University of Denver
- Occupations: Journalist; Consultant
- Children: 2
- Writing career
- Language: English
- Notable works: Seeds of Terror: How Drugs, Thugs, and Crime Are Reshaping the Afghan War
- Notable awards: SAJA Journalism Award
- Website: gretchenpeters.org

Gretchen Peters is an American journalist specialized in transnational organized crime and the author of Seeds of Terror: How Drugs, Thugs, and Crime Are Reshaping the Afghan War. She is the executive director of CINTOC, the Center on Illicit Networks and Transnational Organized Crime, an operational think tank set up by Peters herself between 2012 and 2013. CINTOC's work is focused on the intersection between transnational organized crime and national security and the executive director of The Satao Project, a consulting firm that supports governments and industries to counter serious organized crime and corruption, and their convergence with terrorism, violence and social unrest.

== Early life and education ==
Peters has a BA from Harvard University and a Masters in International Relations from the University of Denver's Josef Korbel School of International Studies. At the Korbel School, she was a 2012 recipient of the Sié Chéou-Kang security and diplomacy fellowship and the Association of Former Intelligence Officers Life's Choices Foundation Scholarship.

== Career ==
Peters began her career as a journalist, working at the newspaper The Cambodia Daily in the early years after its launch. For the following ten years, she covered Pakistan and Afghanistan, first for the Associated Press and later as a reporter for ABC News. Peters was nominated for an Emmy for her coverage of the 2007 assassination of Benazir Bhutto and won the SAJA Journalism Award for a Nightline segment on Pervez Musharraf.

In her work as investigative journalist Peters has conducted extensive research on the intersection between transnational organized crime and national security, from drugs and money laundering to wildlife and timber trafficking. Following the publication of her book, she advised U.S. military and diplomats in Afghanistan.

Peters was previously Senior Fellow on Transnational Crime at the Terrorism, Transnational Crime and Corruption Center at George Mason University, School of Public Policy. She also co-chaired an OECD Task Force working to improve policy approaches to fight the trafficking of wildlife and other environmentally sensitive goods. Peters serves on the Board of Advisors of the Center on Sanctions and Illicit Finance at the Foundation for Defense of Democracies.

== Convergence ==
=== Wildlife, drugs, and US national security ===
In 2015, Peters traveled to Africa with The Satao Project to study ivory supply chains in Tanzania and Kenya. Her work zeroed in on “a regional ecosystem moving ivory, drugs and guns … a matrix of different organisations that collaborate to move illegal goods along the Swahili coast.” She quickly identified the underlying problem: corruption. “If there’s a network that is moving illegal goods from one country to another, there are inevitably government officials involved, protecting them or looking the other way,” she said. Since then Peters has continued focus on the intersection of wildlife, narcotics, and U.S. national security interests, being cited in multiple articles, briefs, and documentaries.

=== Terrorism and drug trafficking ===
In 2009 Peters published Seeds of Terror: How Drugs, Thugs, and Crime Are Reshaping the Afghan War. In the book, Peters argues there is a deepening relationship between the Taliban and drug traffickers. "They start to look more like Tony Soprano and his guys than holy warriors," Peters said in an interview with CBS News. "They behave like criminals. They're involved in the drugs trade, human trafficking, kidnapping, gun running…all sorts of criminal activity." Peters spent five years researching the book, interviewing insurgents, drug kingpins, government officials, and poppy farmers. She discussed the book in a June 2009 appearance on the Daily Show with Jon Stewart.

In 2010 Peters published a paper about the Haqqani network, a Pakistan-based militant group, with West Point's Combating Terrorism Center and in 2012, Peters testified before the U.S. Congress about the Haqqani network.

== Selected publications ==
- Seeds of Terror: How Heroin Is Bankrolling the Taliban and al Qaeda; Thomas Dunne Books; May 12, 2009; ISBN 0312379277
- "The Curse of the Shiny Object; How Humans Fight Problems Where They Are Visible, and Why We Need to See Beyond"; Prism; National Defense University.
- "Haqqani Network Financing: The Evolution of an Industry"; Harmony Project; Center on Combating Terrorism at West Point; October 10, 2010.
- "How Financial Power Can Be Used to Save Iconic Species from Extinction"; Business Insider; April 22, 2015.
- "Crime and Insurgency"; Harmony Project; October 15, 2010.
- "Incorporation Law Enforcement Interrogation Techniques on the Battlefield"; CTC Sentinel: July 2009.
- "Chapter 5: Traffickers and Truckers: Illicit Afghan and Pakistani Power Structures with a Shadowy but Influential Role"; Center for Complex Operations; ISBN 9780986186578.
