= Gretchen Kirby =

Gretchen Kirby is an educator in the field of special education and autism intervention. She is a special education consultant in the state of Massachusetts who has been working in the field of special education for over 20 years.

== Education ==
Kirby graduated from the University of Vermont in 1992 with a Master's degree in Special Education. She received a Bachelor's degree in early education in 1989, also at the University of Vermont.

== Career ==
Kirby is the former Autism Specialist for the Massachusetts Department of Education, as well as the overseer of a federally funded grant program. She also worked in the psychiatric and neurodevelopmental genetics unit at Massachusetts General Hospital as a Project Director for autism family studies. From 2000 to 2004, Kirby served as the statewide autism consultant for the Vermont Department of Education, in charge of statewide training and technical assistance. She works as a private autism consultant in the state of Massachusetts, who provides training and technical assistance at the school district and individual team level.
