= Gretchen Matthews =

Mathematician

Gretchen L. Matthews (born 1973) is a mathematician specializing in algebraic coding theory. She is a professor of mathematics at Virginia Tech.

== Education and career ==
Matthews graduated from Oklahoma State University in 1995, majoring in mathematics. She completed her Ph.D. in mathematics at Louisiana State University in 1999. Her dissertation, Weierstrass Pairs and Minimum Distance of Goppa Codes, was supervised by Robert F. Lax.

After postdoctoral research at the University of Tennessee, she joined the Clemson University faculty in 2001, and was promoted to full professor in 2012. She moved to Virginia Tech in 2018. At Virginia Tech, she directs the cryptography and cybersecurity option of the Computational Modeling and Data Analytics program, is director of the Southwest Virginia Node of the Commonwealth Cyber Initiative, and is also affiliated with the Hume Center for National Security and Technology.

Matthews is chair of the Committee on the Participation of Women of the Mathematical Association of America for 2020–2023.

== Recognition ==
Matthews was named a Fellow of the Association for Women in Mathematics, in the 2021 class of fellows, "for contributions to and leadership of activities to encourage girls and women to study and enjoy mathematics; for service to the profession in fostering collaborative research groups with junior faculty and postdocs; and for excellence in mentoring".
