= Gierasch =

Gierasch is a surname. Notable people with the surname include:

- Adam Gierasch, screenwriter, film director, and actor. Also known for his professional work jointly with his wife Jace Anderson
- Lila Gierasch (born 1948), American biochemist and biophysicist
- Stefan Gierasch (1926–2014), American film and television actor
