= Gretchen W. McClain =

American business executive

Gretchen McClain
- Education: University of Utah (BS)

Gretchen W. McClain is an American business executive. She currently serves on the board of directors for Booz Allen Hamilton and Ametek. She served as the president and chief executive officer of Xylem Inc. (NYSE: XYL), and as the former chief director of the International Space Station and Deputy Associate Administrator of Human Space Exploration at NASA.

== Early life ==
She was born in US. She graduated from the University of Utah in Salt Lake City, Utah, with a bachelor's degree in mechanical engineering.

== Career ==
Gretchen W. McClain served as the chief executive officer of Xylem Inc. from 2011 to September 9, 2013, and served as its president until September 9, 2013,

She started her career as a Senior Leader in guiding space shuttle and space station initiatives for the NASA. She joined AlliedSignal in 1999. After its merger, she served as vice president and general manager at Honeywell Aerospace, a subsidiary of Honeywell (NYSE: HON). She joined the ITT Corporation (NYSE: ITT) in 2005, where she served as president of ITT's Residential & Commercial Water business and later as president of the ITT Fluid and Motion Control business. She served on the board of directors of the Hydraulic Institute.

In 2011, she served as president and CEO of Xylem, Inc. She has supported modernising the water infrastructure, including the sewage system, in the United States.

In September 2013, in response to a 3.4% decline in stock value, McClain resigned as CEO of Xylem Inc and was temporarily replaced by former chairman Steven Loranger.
