= Gretchen Sibley =

American zoologist

Gretchen Sibley (May 14, 1914 – November 30, 2013) was a longtime science educator, creator of the docent program at the Los Angeles County Museum of Natural History, and first executive director of the California State Science Fair.

== Early life and education ==
Gretchen Sibley was raised in Los Angeles. She remembered visiting museums as a child with her parents, who were interested in art. She trained as a teacher, and taught at a junior high school in Los Angeles for three years, while working on an advanced degree in zoology at the University of Southern California. She wrote a thesis, "A Comparative Study of the Histological Structure of Oral Glands on Certain Mammals," to earn her master's degree in 1946.

== Career ==
As a teacher she had borrowed specimens from the Los Angeles County Museum of Natural History, and became familiar with the staff through that activity. Sibley started working for the Los Angeles County Museum of History in 1946 as a science instructor, the museum's first education specialist. Her work involved organizing programs for school groups and schoolteachers, including weekend field trips, tours, and public lectures.

Sibley organized a science fair for Los Angeles students at the museum in 1941. Building from that experience, and as treasurer of the California Science Teachers' Association, she was part of the founding of the California State Science Fair in 1952, as she chaired the first steering committee through incorporation, then served as the Executive Director for the Fair's first decade.

Sibley wrote several natural history books for young readers, including La Brea Story (1968), La Brea Fossils (1970). As director of the museum's Natural Science Workshop, she worked directly with thousands of promising high school students over the years, preparing them for careers in science.

Sibley was active with the Southern California Academy of Sciences from the early 1960s, and often the only woman on their executive board; she prepared symposium proceedings for the Academy, and was managing editor of their Bulletin. In 1962, she was named an SCAS Fellow for her work with the gifted high school students.

An adventuresome traveler, she collected material specimens and took photographs in thirty countries and across the United States, for the museum and for educational films.

== Later life ==
Sibley retired from her museum position as director of docent programs in 1973, but continued to be active at the museum as "museum education specialist emeritus" and honorary archivist. In retirement, despite failing eyesight, she catalogued the museum archives as a volunteer, and was named Los Angeles County Volunteer of the Year in 1996 for her efforts. At the museum's 75th anniversary celebration in 1988, Sibley presented a slideshow and lecture about the history of the museum. In 2012, she was honored at the fiftieth anniversary of the museum's docent program. She also wrote a history of the Southern California Academy of Sciences on the occasion of their centennial in 1991.

In her later years, Sibley lived at a senior care center in Lake Forest. She hired a chauffeur and bought adaptive equipment to allow her to continue her museum projects once a week. She also served as president of the Visually Impaired Club at Leisure World.

Gretchen Sibley died in 2013, age 99.

== Legacy ==
Miss Sibley appears to be the namesake of a minor character in Thomas Heric's 2010 science fiction novel The Healers, in which a "Marjorie Sibley" works at a county museum in Southern California, as curator of marine life, and encourages the main character Wesley to enter the annual science fair.

Alumni from Sibley's era as director of the Natural Science Workshop included entomologist Charles L. Hogue and Tee Guidotti, retired professor of occupational and environmental medicine at George Washington University.
