= Ross Parmenter =

Canadian music critic, editor, and author (1912–1999)

Ross Parmenter (May 30, 1912 – October 18, 1999) was a Canadian music critic, editor, and author who was primarily active in New York City. He wrote several books on Mexico and was a news editor and staff writer at The New York Times for 30 years.

== Life and career ==
Born in Toronto, Ontario, Parmenter graduated from the University of Trinity College, a federated college of the University of Toronto, in 1933. He joined the staff of The New York Times (NYT) in 1934 where he initially covered shipping news. He joined the music staff at the NYT in 1940 and for the next 24 years wrote news, features, criticism and a column called The World of Music. In 1955 he was named music news editor, a position he maintained until 1964 when he retired from the paper.

As an author, Parmenter published a dozen books, many of them about Mexico. He was particularly interested in Spanish colonial architecture and traveled to Mexico numerous times while working out of New York City. In the 1940s he visited several major 16th century monasteries in Mexico, including the Church of San Miguel Arcangel in Ixmiquilpan in the state of Hidalgo, the Monastery of San Miguel Arcángel in Huejotzingo, and the Ex-monastery of Santiago Apóstol in Cuilapan. According to Richard D. Perry, "His descriptions of these early colonial monuments, then virtually unknown to American art historians or travelers, remain among the earliest accounts in English and can claim considerable historic interest." He also discovered the indigenous pictorial manuscripts Lienzo de Tequixtepec I and II, which he documented and analyzed in his publication Four Lienzos of the Coixtlahuaca Valley (1982).Parmenter, Ross (1982). ‘‘Four Lienzos of the Coixtlahuaca Valley’’. Studies in Pre-Columbian Art & Archaeology, 26. Washington D.C.: Dumbarton Oaks – Trustees for Harvard University. After his retirement, he maintained homes in both New York City and Oaxaca, Mexico.

In his book Lawrence in Oaxaca, Parmenter discusses & analyzes the relationship of D. H. Lawrence's writings to his time living in Mexico. Many of his works highlight the difficulties and rewards of observing things in great detail. For example, his book The Plant in my Window shares his observations of the growth of a plant in his New York City apartment. Through his observations of the plant, he learns to give focused attention to what he is looking at. By learning to look more closely at things, he also learns to draw, and his learning to draw teaches him even more about focused looking. He works through similar themes in a more detailed way in his books The Awakened Eye, A Week in Yanhuitlan, Stages in a Journey, and A House for Buddha.

Parmenter died in New York on October 18, 1999, at the age of 87. Some of his papers are collected at the Latin American Library at Tulane University.

== Partial list of works ==
- The Awakened Eye
- The Plant in my window
- School of the Soldier
- Week in Yanhuitlan
- Lawrence in Oaxaca
- Stages in a Journey
- A House for Buddha: A Memoir with Drawings
- Lienzo of Tulancingo, Oaxaca
