= Gretchen Keppel-Aleks =

American scientist and professor

- Awards: Kavli Fellow, NASA Group Achievement Award, NOAA Climate and Global Change Postdoctoral Fellow, American Association of University Women Dissertation Fellowship

Academic background
- Education: Ph.D California Institute of Technology, Environmental Science and Engineering (2011) M.S California Institute of Technology, Environmental Science and Engineering (2006) S.B Massachusetts Institute of Technology, Chemical Engineering (2004)
- Thesis: "Constraints on the global carbon budget from variations in total column carbon dioxide"
- Website: http://clasp-research.engin.umich.edu/faculty/keppel-aleks/

Gretchen Keppel-Aleks is an American scientist and associate professor at the University of Michigan in the College of Engineering's department of Climate and Space Sciences and Engineering. She primarily focuses on Earth's climate and the effects of greenhouse gasses on Earth's atmosphere. Keppel-Aleks has been named a Kavli Fellow by the U.S. National Academy of Sciences.

== Career and research ==
=== Career history ===
Keppel-Aleks began her academic career working as a research assistant during both her undergraduate and graduate and studies (at Massachusetts Institute of Technology and later California Institute of Technology). Currently, Keppel-Aleks works as a research assistant at the University of Michigan. She works in the department of Climate and Space Sciences and Engineering (2013–Present).

Under the supervision of Paul O. Wennberg, Keppel-Aleks completed her dissertation (Ph.D.) in 2012. Her thesis, titled "Constraints on the global carbon budget from variations in total column carbon dioxide", examines the importance of evaluating patterns of CO_{2} when predicting models of global climate change.

=== Research ===
Keppel-Aleks fields of interests are: the carbon cycle and climate interactions, the remote sensing of atmospheric gasses and vegetation properties, Earth System modeling, and atmospheric tracer transport.

Keppel-Aleks has made many notable research contributions, especially surrounding greenhouse gas emissions and global climate change. She led several research projects, such as a project titled "Developing a Mechanistic Understanding of Variability in the Atmospheric CO_{2} Growth Rate Owing to Interannual Climate Oscillations", in which scientists explored how Earth systems react to a changing climate. She has also participates in NASA's OCO-2 research team, in which she and 20 other scientists work to investigate how human populations interact with, and contribute to the presence of CO_{2} in Earth's atmosphere.

== Awards and honors ==
=== Academic awards ===
Keppel-Aleks has won many awards during her scientific career. In 2019, she won AGU's Global Environmental Change Early Career Award for her contributions in global environmental change. She has also received a research highlight from the Department of Energy for her leading research on the use of the Community Earth System Model (CESM) in determining the future of global climate change with regards to rising levels of CO_{2}. She has also been awarded several fellowships, such as the NOAA Climate and Global Change Postdoctoral Fellowship, as well as the American Association of University Women dissertation fellowship. Additionally, Keppel-Aleks has been awarded the Kavli Fellowship. As a Kavli fellow, Keppel-Aleks presented on the importance of terrestrial and aquatic cycle monitoring in the monitoring of CO_{2.}

=== Grants ===
Currently, Keppel-Aleks is being funded for 11 individual projects, one of which, titled "Developing a Mechanistic Understanding of Variability in the Atmospheric CO_{2} Growth Rate Owing to Interannual Climate Oscillations ", is a project worth over $1 million funded through NASA and the University of Michigan. Other grants and fellowships awarded to Keppel-Aleks include NASA's Earth and Space Science Fellowship and in the past, Keppel-Aleks received research grants such as one from Keck Institute for Space Studies, in which Keppel-Aleks examined patterns of photosynthesis and solar-induced fluorescence emitted from photosynthetic organisms.
