= Philipp Humm =

German artist, film director and business executive

- Humm in 2026
- Born: Philipp Rudolf Humm; 2 October 1959 (age 67); Saarbrücken, West Germany
- Education: Saarland University; University of Michigan; International Institute for Management Development; Florence Academy of Art; London Fine Art Studio
- Occupations: Artist; film director; former business executive
- Years active: 1982-present
- Known for: Cinematic interpretation of both parts of Goethe's Faust in an art film The Last Faust
- Style: Pop-Expressionism
- Website: philipphumm.art

Philipp Rudolf Humm is an artist, film director and a former European business executive.

== Early life ==
Humm was born in 1959 in Saarbrücken, West Germany. He is German and British; his mother is Belgian. Humm did his Baccalauréat at the Lycée Franco Allemand in Saarbrücken. After studying philosophy and business administration at the University of Saarland, Germany and the University of Michigan in Ann Arbor, USA, Humm received an MBA with distinction in 1985 from the IMD Business School in Switzerland.

== Career ==
=== Art ===
Humm has been an artist and film director since 2015.

Philipp Humm's transition from CEO to artist and ‘ironic-narrator’ of modern life has been less than orthodox. Humm's work has attracted considerable media attention with his first show making the front page of The Wall Street Journal.

His art traverses societal norms and directly questions human nature and what lies ahead as we blindly pursue technological advancement with sometimes shocking alacrity. The acclaimed art critic Edward Lucie-Smith wrote a book, Pop Expressionism, on Humm's early works on paper.

Humm studied at London's Fine Art Studio in 2015/16 and Florence's Academy of Art in 2016. Primarily a painter and sculptor, he also works with a variety of art-forms including film, digital photography and literature to broaden the narrative. Recognising the transformative nature of art, he is keen to democratise the rarefied universe in which it exists today.

2018-20 Humm created a Gesamtkunstwerk, The Last Faust, with over 150 artworks, an illustrated novella and a feature art film. The film is the first cinematic interpretation of Johan Wolfgang von Goethe's Faust 1 and 2 . It was released on 2 December 2020. The artworks cover sculptures, pencil drawings, watercolour and oil painting and fine art photos.

Humm had solo exhibitions at London's Saatchi, Dadiani, Riflemaker and Hix galleries in addition to group shows in London, Venice, Potsdam and Remagen. Humm exhibited at the museum of Nevada in Las Vegas and several iconic art fairs in New York, Los Angeles, and Seoul.

=== Business ===
Humm is a tech investor, senior adviser to Antin Infrastructure Partners in London, Chairman of Eurofiber, NL, a board member with Lynthia, Spain and up to 2017, board member with Shine Technologies, Israel.

Humm served as Vodafone's CEO for Europe from 1 October 2012 [6] to 2015. From 2005 to 2012 Humm held various executive roles with Deutsche Telekom. From 2005 to 2008, Humm was CEO and Chief Sales Officer for T-Mobile Germany. From January 2007 to 2008, he also served as a member of the management board of Deutsche Telekom's wireline division. From 2009 to 2010, Humm was CRO (Chief Regional Officer) and a member of the executive committee of T-Mobile International. From November 2010 – June 2012 Humm was CEO of T-Mobile USA.

Humm started up various companies, such as Gourmondo.de (2002) an online grocery retailer in Germany.

From 2000 to 2002, Humm was an executive with the online retailer Amazon, where he held roles as managing director for Amazon Germany and France, and VP Europe.

From 1992 to 1999, Humm was an executive with the grocery retailer Tengelmann in Germany, where he became a member of the executive board in 1996 and in 1998 CEO of their food-discounter, Plus. From 1986 to 1992, Humm was with the consulting firm McKinsey & Company in Germany and Los Angeles.
