= Gretchen McCord =

Texan librarian and lawyer specialising in copyright issues

Gretchen McCord (sometimes Gretchen McCord Hoffmann or Gretchen McCord DeFlorio) is an American librarian and lawyer specialising in copyright issues in libraries. McCord is also known for the widely held book Copyright in cyberspace : questions and answers for librarians

McCord was an academic librarian and rose to President of the Texas Library Association before going to law school. She is currently (2014) Special Council to the Association.

She has a B.A. from Rice University in Houston, Master of Science in Information Systems from University of North Texas and a Juris Doctor from University of Texas School of Law.

== Books ==
- Copyright in cyberspace: questions and answers for librarians Gretchen McCord Hoffmann, 2001. ISBN 1555704107
- Copyright in cyberspace 2: questions and answers for librarians Gretchen McCord Hoffmann, 2005. ISBN 1555705170
- What you need to know about privacy law: a guide for librarians and educators Gretchen McCord, 2013. ISBN 1610690818

== See also ==
- Interview at Library Juice
