= Yvonne Mai (actress) =

German actress

Yvonne Mai (born in Hamburg, Germany) is an American-German actress, with Danish and French roots.

== Early career ==
Mai developed an interest in modelling and theater in early stages of her life. As a teenager she began modelling and stage work in Germany. In her late teens she was scouted for the German TV series ‘Die Schulermittler’ as a lead.

== Career ==
Mai is currently signed with International Artists Management (IAM) in London, England. She worked on film projects such as her most known work in Netflix TV series Vikings: Valhalla and as a lead in The Last Faust directed by Philipp Humm and starring Steven Berkhoff, Blackbird directed by Michael Flatley, Spy City directed by Miguel Alexandre and several short films, i.e. The Drop and Reflections.

Additionally, she has worked on global commercial campaigns with brands such as John Frieda, Neutrogena, Peloton, Ikea and more.
