= Gretchen Reydams-Schils =

American classicist

Professor Gretchen Reydams-Schils

Academic background
- Education: Catholic University of Leuven; University of Cincinnati
- Alma mater: University of California at Berkeley
- Thesis: Stoic and Platonist Readings of Plato's Timaeus

Academic work
- Discipline: Ancient philosophy
- Institutions: University of Notre Dame

Gretchen Reydams-Schils is professor in the Program of Liberal Studies at the University of Notre Dame, and holds concurrent appointments in Classics, Philosophy, and Theology. She is a specialist in Plato and the traditions of Platonism and Stoicism.

== Career ==
Gretchen Reydams-Schils gained a BA (magna cum laude) at the Catholic University of Leuven where she majored in Classics, with her Senior Thesis on “Plato’s ‘Myth of Er’ in the Republic”; an MA at the University of Cincinnati; and a PhD from the University of California at Berkeley. Her Classics/Ancient Philosophy dissertation was on “Stoic and Platonist Readings of Plato's Timaeus”. She acted as Research Fellow in the Institute of Philosophy at the Catholic University of Leuven.

She teaches at the University of Notre Dame, where she also runs the Notre Dame Workshop on Ancient Philosophy, She has been a fellow at the Center for Hellenic Studies and at the Israel Institute for Advanced Studies, and also held positions as visiting professor at the University of Bordeaux, France, in 2013; at Montpellier, Université Paul Valéry, France, in 2005; at Albert-Ludwigs-Universität Freiburg, Germany, in 2002; and at Spiritan Missionary Philosophy Seminary, Arusha, Tanzania, in Spring 1998 during a sabbatical. She was Directrice d’Études at the École Pratique des Hautes Études Paris, France, for four seminars on Calcidius, in May–June 2004.

She edited a 2003 edited volume, Plato's Timaeus as Cultural Icon which explored the influence of Plato's Timaeus and attempted to account for its cultural and philosophic status. In her 2005 book The Roman Stoics: Self, Responsibility, and Affection, she studied the philosophical basis that underpins the way Roman Stoics integrated philosophy into the social practice of living, friendship, political community, parenting and marriage. In a review, Margaret Graver describes it as looking "beyond the Stoics' ethical absolutism to emphasise, instead, their engagement with other human beings".

She has written over 20 philosophy book reviews for learned journals including The Journal of Roman Studies, The Journal of Hellenic Studies, and Classical Philology. She has also won over 20 academic awards and honours, including a Guggenheim Fellowship, a Fulbright Fellowship, Humboldt Foundation Fellowship, Andrew W. Mellon Foundation Grant, and a EURIAS Senior Fellowship.

== Personal life ==
She published a letter in the Catholic magazine Commonweal marking her discontent at a change to the Nicene Creed, during the tenure of Pope Benedict XVI, in which the phrase “born of the Virgin Mary” was changed to “incarnate of”. In the article she argued that the change identified "a deep strand of repulsion at the female body in the Christian tradition". She is married to professor Luc Reydams with three children.

== Selected publications ==
=== Articles ===
- "Calcidius on the Human and the World-Soul, and Middle-Platonist Psychology", Apeiron 39(2) (2006), 197–220.
- "Meta-Discourse: Plato’s Timaeus According to Calcidius", Phronesis 52 (2007), 301–327.
- "Philosophy and Education in Stoicism of the Roman Imperial Era", Oxford Review of Education 36(5) (2010), 561–574.
- "Authority and Agency in Stoicism", Greek, Roman, and Byzantine Studies 51 (2011), 296–322.

=== Books ===
- Calcidius on Plato's Timaeus: Greek Philosophy, Latin Reception, and Christian Contexts (Cambridge University Press, 2020): ISBN 978-1-108-42056-3
- The Roman Stoics: Self, Responsibility, and Affection (University of Chicago Press, 2005); ISBN 0226710262
- Demiurge and Providence, Stoic and Platonist Readings of Plato's Timaeus (Brepols, 1999); ISBN 978-2-503-50656-2
- An Anthology of Snakebites: On Women, Love and Philosophy (Seven Bridges Press, 2001); ISBN 188911913X
- Plato's Timaeus as Cultural Icon (Ed.) (Notre Dame 2003)
- Thinking Through Excerpts: Studies on Stobaeus (Ed.) (Brepols, 2011)
- Pouvoir et puissances chez Philon d'Alexandrie (Ed.) (Brepols 2016).

=== Book chapters ===
- "Seneca’s Platonism: The Soul and its Divine Origin," in Ancient Models of Mind: Studies in Human and Divine Rationality, ed. by A. Nightingale and D. Sedley (Cambridge: Cambridge University Press, 2010), 196–215.
- "Myth and Poetry in the Timaeus," in Plato and the Poets ed. by P. Destrée and F.-G. Herrmann (Leiden: Brill, 2011), 349–360.
- "The Academy, the Stoics, and Cicero on Plato’s Timaeus," in Plato and the Stoics ed. by Alexander Long (Cambridge: Cambridge University Press, 2013), 29–58.
- "Teaching Pericles: Cicero on the Study of Nature," in Roman Philosophy, ed. by K. Volk and G. Williams (Oxford University Press, 2015), 91–107.
