= Gretchen Gierach =

American epidemiologist

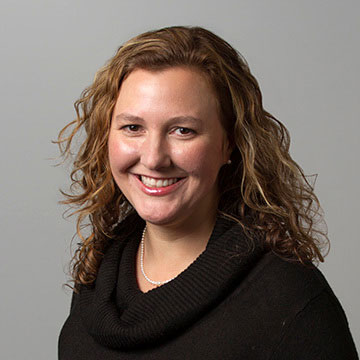
- Education: Pennsylvania State University (B.S.); University of Pittsburgh (M.P.H., Ph.D.)
- Scientific career
- Fields: Cancer epidemiology, women’s health
- Workplaces: National Cancer Institute
- Doctoral advisor: Francesmary Modugno

Gretchen L. Gierach is an American epidemiologist and women's health researcher. She is the chief of the Integrative Tumor Epidemiology Branch in the National Cancer Institute.

== Education ==
Gierach completed a B.S. from Pennsylvania State University in 1998. She earned a M.P.H. (2004) and Ph.D. (2006) in epidemiology from University of Pittsburgh with a focus in cancer epidemiology and women’s health. Her master's thesis was titled Gender of Offspring and Maternal Ovarian Cancer Risk. Gierach's doctoral advisor was Francesmary Modugno. Her dissertation was titled Inflammation and Breast Cancer Risk. Gierach acknowledge the support of Jane A. Cauley, Joel L. Weissfeld, John W. Wilson, Victor G. Vogel III, Jennifer K. Simpson, and Roberta B. Ness. Gierach also credited the support from her colleagues, Phyllis Kernoff Mansfield, Patricia Barthalow Koch, Susannah Heyer Barsom, and Ann Voda.

== Career ==
Gierach joined the National Cancer Institute Division of Cancer Epidemiology and Genetics (DCEG) as a NCI Cancer Prevention Fellow in 2006. As a fellow, HREB Branch Chief Louise A. Brinton, offered Gierach the opportunity to develop and oversee a new project known as the Breast Radiology Evaluation and Study of Tissues (BREAST), which is funded by proceeds from the sale of the U.S. Postal Service Breast Cancer Research Stamp. The study, which Gierach co-leads with Mark E. Sherman, a senior clinician in HREB, considers both the radiologic features of the breast through mammography and the histologic, molecular, and biochemical characteristics of breast tissue among women undergoing image-guided breast biopsies at the University of Vermont Breast Cancer Surveillance System site. Gierach is relating indices of mammographic density to tissue-level biomarkers that may uncover the mechanisms linking high mammographic density to breast cancer risk.

Gierach became a tenure-track investigator in 2010, was awarded tenure in 2017, and became Deputy Chief of the Integrative Tumor Epidemiology Branch in 2018. Gierach serves as chair of the Division’s Breast Cancer Working Group and co-chair of the DCEG Hormone Laboratory Advisory Committee.

=== Research ===
Gierach studies of the etiology of hormonally-related female cancers, particularly in the molecular mechanisms underlying breast carcinogenesis. Her interdisciplinary research program has a special emphasis on the molecular epidemiology of mammographic density, one of the strongest risk factors for breast cancer.

Gierach's lab is conducting several investigations designed to address the role of genes in mammographic density. In collaboration with DCEG’s Clinical Genetics Branch, they are examining whether mammographic density and computer-extracted mammographic texture pattern features differ by BRCA1/2 mutation status.

In addition to addressing how molecular epidemiologic factors may influence mammographic density and its associated breast cancer risk, Gierach is addressing other ways in which density may relate to breast carcinogenesis. In light of emerging evidence indicating that reductions in mammographic density may predict response to tamoxifen treatment, Gierach and her colleagues initiated a study within Kaiser Permanente Northwest to determine whether breast cancer patients who experience large reductions in density following tamoxifen treatment have an improved prognosis. We have also launched the Ultrasound Study of Tamoxifen, in which we are using novel ultrasound tomography methods to assess changes in volumetric breast density within the first year of tamoxifen therapy. These studies may provide support for future investigations evaluating change in mammographic density as a “biosensor” of factors that increase or decrease breast cancer risk.

== Awards and honors ==
Gierach has been awarded the DCEG Molecular Epidemiology Research Funding Award, the NCI Merit Award in Cancer Prevention Research Training, and an Award to Advance Research on Cancers in Women from the NCI Office of Science Planning and Assessment and the NIH Office of Research on Women’s Health.
