= Grete Rikko =

German-American painter

- Born: Grete Rindskopf; April 13, 1908; Werden Essen
- Died: September 22, 1998 (aged 90); New York
- Known for: Painting
- Movement: Abstract Expressionism

Grete Rikko (born Grete Rindskopf; April 13, 1908 – September 22, 1998) was a German-American artist associated first with the School of Paris and later with abstract expressionism in New York City. She primarily worked in gouache, oil paint, and collage, both on paper and canvas.

== Early life ==
Grete Rindskopf was born in Werden, Essen, Germany on 13 April 1908. Her father, Otto Rindskopf (15 July 1863 – 8 September 1934) was originally from Frankfurt. Her mother, Henriette (Lilienthal) Rindskopf (1 December 1871 – 19 March 1942) was originally from Hanover. Rikko had three siblings: her older sister Hilde (later Kramer; 19 December 1900 – ca. April 1942), her older brother Fritz (17 October 1903 – 13 June 1980), and her twin brother Hans (13 April 1908 – 21 October 1942.) The Rindkopfs ran a textile factory that manufactured aprons, which employed up to 200 workers.

Grete Rindskopf began studying art at a young age at the Volkswangschule, associated with the Museum Folkwang in Essen. One of the most important collections of modern art in Europe, the Museum Folkwang was first established in Hagen in 1902 before moving to Essen in 1922 after the death of its founder. Here, Rikko was exposed to the works of post-impressionist painters like Paul Gauguin and Vincent van Gogh, as well as German expressionists like Emil Nolde, Wilhelm Lehmbruck, and Ernst Ludwig Kirchner.

== Career in Europe: Paris and Belgrade (1928-1938) ==
In the late 1920s, Grete Rindskopf—like many young artists of the era—moved to Paris, where she joined the exploding art scene later known as the School of Paris. She enrolled in the Académie Ranson art school in the Montparnasse neighborhood, where she studied under the painter Roger Bissière. She also took lessons from the fauvist André Derain.

In Paris, Grete Rindskopf adopted the nom d’artiste Grete Rikko. She showed her paintings in the major exhibitions of the Parisian art scene such as the Salon d'automne (1931) and the Salon de l'art français indépendant(1931). She also showed paintings in small group exhibits in local galleries such as Galerie Bonaparte and Jeune Europe. In the early 1930s, Rikko also began to exhibit her work in her native Germany. She had solo exhibitions in her hometown at the Galerie Schaumann in 1930 and 1932. (Rikko's 1932 exhibition at Galerie Schaumann was a joint presentation with Hein Heckroth.) She also participated in a small group show at the Galerie Hartberg in Berlin in 1933 and in larger exhibitions in Dusseldorf and Bochum.

In 1933, Rikko moved from Paris to Belgrade, then the rapidly-growing capital of Yugoslavia. She continued to paint and exhibit her works, including in a solo exhibition at the Franco-Serbian Club (Francusko-Srpskog Kluba) in December 1933.

== World War II ==
In 1938, faced with the rise of Nazism, Rikko left Yugoslavia for the United States. Her decision to leave was prescient, as she was the only one of her siblings to evade Nazi persecution.

Only a few months after Rikko landed in New York, her brother Fritz was arrested and interned in the Dachau concentration camp. Following his eventual release from Dachau, he fled to France. There, he was incarcerated at Camp des Milles, a camp where French authorities imprisoned refugees fleeing Germany (which was then an enemy of France). Les Milles was known as the “camp des artistes” due to the many German cultural luminaries imprisoned there, and Fritz and the other classical musicians formed a detainees’ orchestra. (Due to injuries from his torture at Dachau, he was unable to play his violin and sang in the choir instead.) In 1939, Fritz successfully applied for a visa to join his sister in New York, thereby securing release from Les Milles before France under the Vichy regime allied with Nazi Germany and surrendered the prisoners at Les Milles to for deportation to the death camps. He arrived in New York in February 1940.

Rikko’s other two siblings were both killed in the Holocaust. Her older sister, Hilde, initially fled to France in 1938. However, in 1942, when France rounded up foreign Jews on behalf of the Nazis, she was arrested and deported to Auschwitz via the Drancy internment camp. She was killed in April 1942. Rikko’s twin brother, Hans, remained in Germany with their mother. He was deported from their hometown to Poland and killed in the Belzec extermination camp in October 1942.

Safely in the United States, Rikko settled in Manhattan’s Greenwich Village. She was initially supported by a scholarship from German Academy of Arts and Sciences in Exile, which funded artists and intellectuals displaced by Nazis to continue their creative work. She also participated in the artistic programming of the Friendship House, a social center for refugees established by the Greater New York Council of Churches. Friendship House provided Rikko with her first opportunity to show her work in the United States when it included her in its exhibit of European artists in exile, held at the 1939 New York World's Fair. This exhibit showed Rikko’s work alongside that of prominent representatives of the European avant-garde such as Herbert Bayer and Amédée Ozenfant. This exhibition, called “New Americans,” was intended as a pendant to the larger exhibition called “American Art Today” in the adjacent gallery, which showcased artwork recently commissioned by the Works Progress Administration.

During her first years in the United States, Rikko also exhibited her work at Carroll College in Helena, Montana, where her brother had been hired as a professor of music.

As a member of the School of Paris, Rikko had been a figurative painter. Now, watching from afar as war and genocide devastated the people and places she had once painted, Rikko turned her back on figuration. She stopped painting portraits and landscapes influenced by German expressionism and French impressionism and developed a wholly new style in which she painted and collaged angular forms against backgrounds of saturated color. Although at first glance these works appeared to be pure abstraction, Rikko insisted that they carried legible meaning. Some critics agreed, including one who described Rikko’s cryptic shapes as “semi-abstractions of refugee camps” and another who wrote “the subject is still discernable even though it has been fully reduced to a symbol.”

Rikko became a U.S. citizen in 1944, at which point she legally changed her last name from Rindskopf to Rikko.

== New York career (1950s-1960s) ==
Rikko’s artistic career peaked in the 1950s and 1960s, coinciding with the height of abstract-expressionism. It was during these decades that Rikko, aged in her 40s and 50s, held most of her solo exhibitions and attracted the most critical attention.

A key point in Rikko’s New York career came in 1954, when two of her works were included in a juried exhibit organized by the Village Art Center at the Whitney Museum of American Art. The Village Art Center sought to “discover and give opportunity to… unrecognized artists whose work has genuine merit,” and Rikko was selected by a jury of art world luminaries including Dorothy Canning Miller and Grace M. Mayer, both prominent curators at the Museum of Modern Art and William Zorach, a well-known sculptor. Rikko was chosen for the exhibit alongside Beauford Delaney and other New York artists who were beginning to explore abstract-expressionism.

Thanks to a reference from the gallerist Betty Parsons, Rikko received a series of solo exhibitions at the Bodley Gallery, located first at 223 East 60th Street and later at 787 Madison Avenue. The Bodley Gallery, which opened around 1950 and remained in operation until 1982, curated intimate solo exhibitions of modern and contemporary artists, including luminaries like Max Ernst, Victor Brauner, René Magritte, Roberto Matta, and Andy Warhol, as well as lesser-known artists like Rikko. Rikko’s own exhibitions, in 1959, 1960, and 1967 were visited by critics from Art News and the New York Times, among others.

In Europe, Rikko attracted new attention as an American artist. She received the most recognition in the Netherlands, where she held exhibitions in the Hague (1954), Amsterdam (1956), Arnhem (1957), and Rotterdam (1958 and 1960). These included the only museum exhibition in her career, a presentation of 36 recent works at the Gemeentemuseum Arnhem (now known as Museum Arnhem) in 1957.

The Netherlands also gave Rikko her only public art commission. In 1955 Rikko and the British sculptor Henry Moore were both hired to decorate a new extension to the Bouwcentrum Rotterdam. The Bouwcentrum (Dutch for “Building Center”) first opened in 1949 as a hall for exhibitions on modern building techniques, intended to inform the postwar reconstruction of the Netherlands. By 1954, the center had already outgrown its original space and the original architect, Joost Boks, was asked to add a new wing. Moore designed a relief in brick for the exterior of the new wing. Rikko painted an enormous abstract mural (four meters high and 16 meters long) in the interior. (Although the original Bouwcentrum still stands at Kruisplein 15, the 1955 extension was demolished in 2010 and replaced by an office building. Moore’s relief was preserved, but Rikko’s mural apparently was not.)

Outside the Netherlands, Rikko exhibited at the Hanover Gallery in London in 1961 and, in the same year, at the Galerie Schaumann in her hometown of Essen, Germany, where she had held one of her first exhibitions 30 years previously.

== Later life ==
Rikko’s final exhibition was at the Bodley Gallery in 1967. She died in 1998.

== Selected exhibitions ==
In her nearly 40-year artistic career, Rikko exhibited her work in numerous solo and group exhibitions in Europe and the United States. These included the following:

1930 (July): Galerie Schaumann, Essen

1931 (April-May): Salon de l'art français indépendant, Paris

1931: Salon d'automne, Paris

1932: Galerie Schaumann, Essen

1932 (May-June): Galerie Jeune Europe 20 May-3 June, Paris

1933 (January): Galerie Hartberg, Berlin

1933 (December): Franco-Serbian Club (Francusko-Srpskog Kluba), Belgrade

1934: Kunsthall, Düsseldorf

1942 (January) Carroll College, Helena Montana

1954 (June): Village Art Center at the Whitney Museum of American Art, New York

1954: Platts Gallery, the Hague

1956: Galerie Sothman, Amsterdam

1957 (March-April): Museum Arnhem, the Netherlands

1958: Galerie t'Venster, Rotterdam

1959 (February-March): Bodley Gallery, New York

1960 (January-February): Cocoa-Tree Ltd, Atlanta, Georgia

1960 (February): Bodley Gallery, New York

1960 (July-August): Bouwcentrum Rotterdam

1961 (January-February): Galerie Schaumann, Essen

1961 (December): Hanover Gallery, London

1967 (January-February): Bodley Gallery, New York

== Public collections ==
Museum van Bommel van Dam, Venlo, the Netherlands

Grey Art Museum, New York University
