= Wood shingle =

Tapered pieces to cover building roofs and walls

A section view of a type of wood shingle

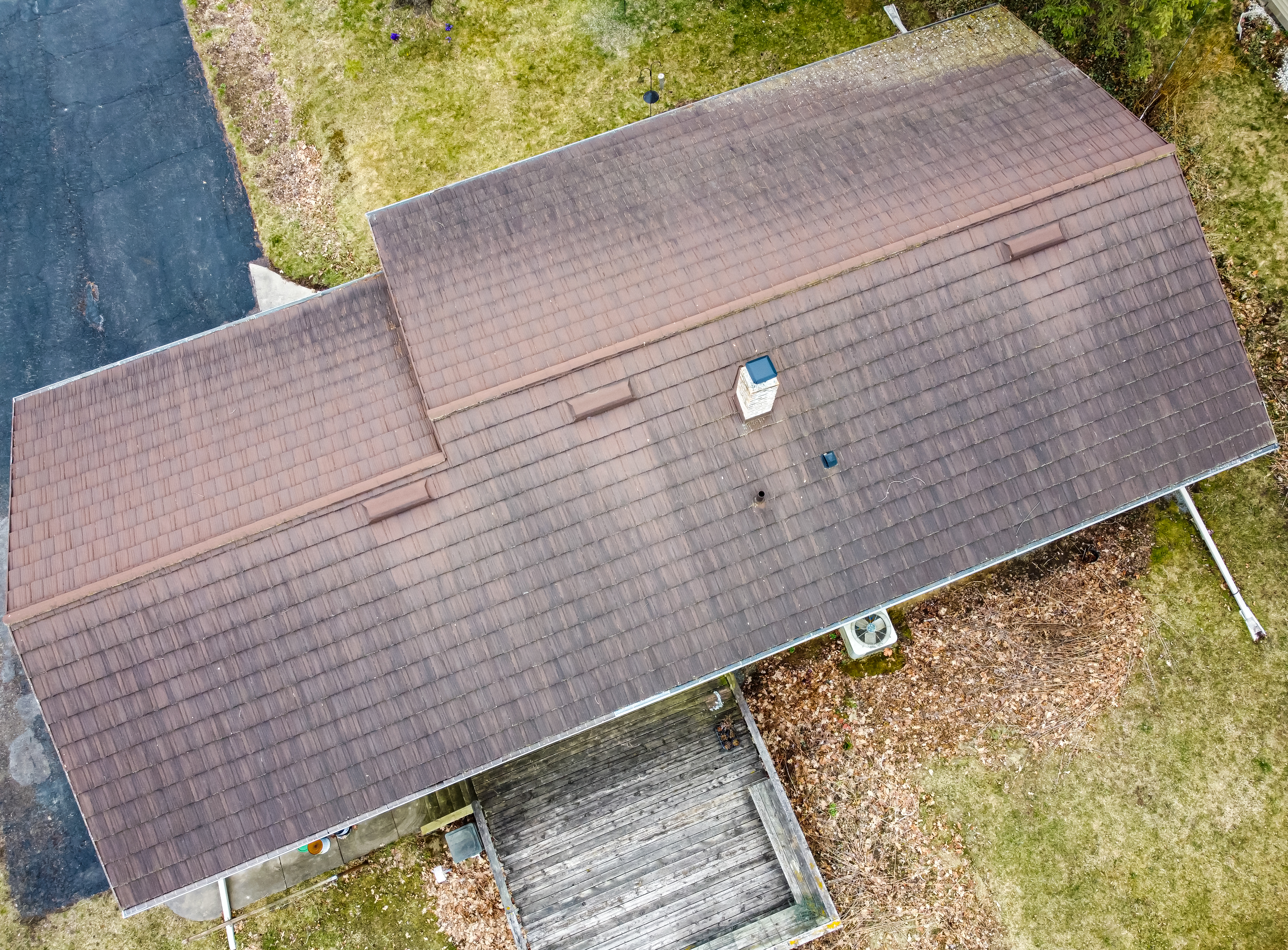
Wood shingles

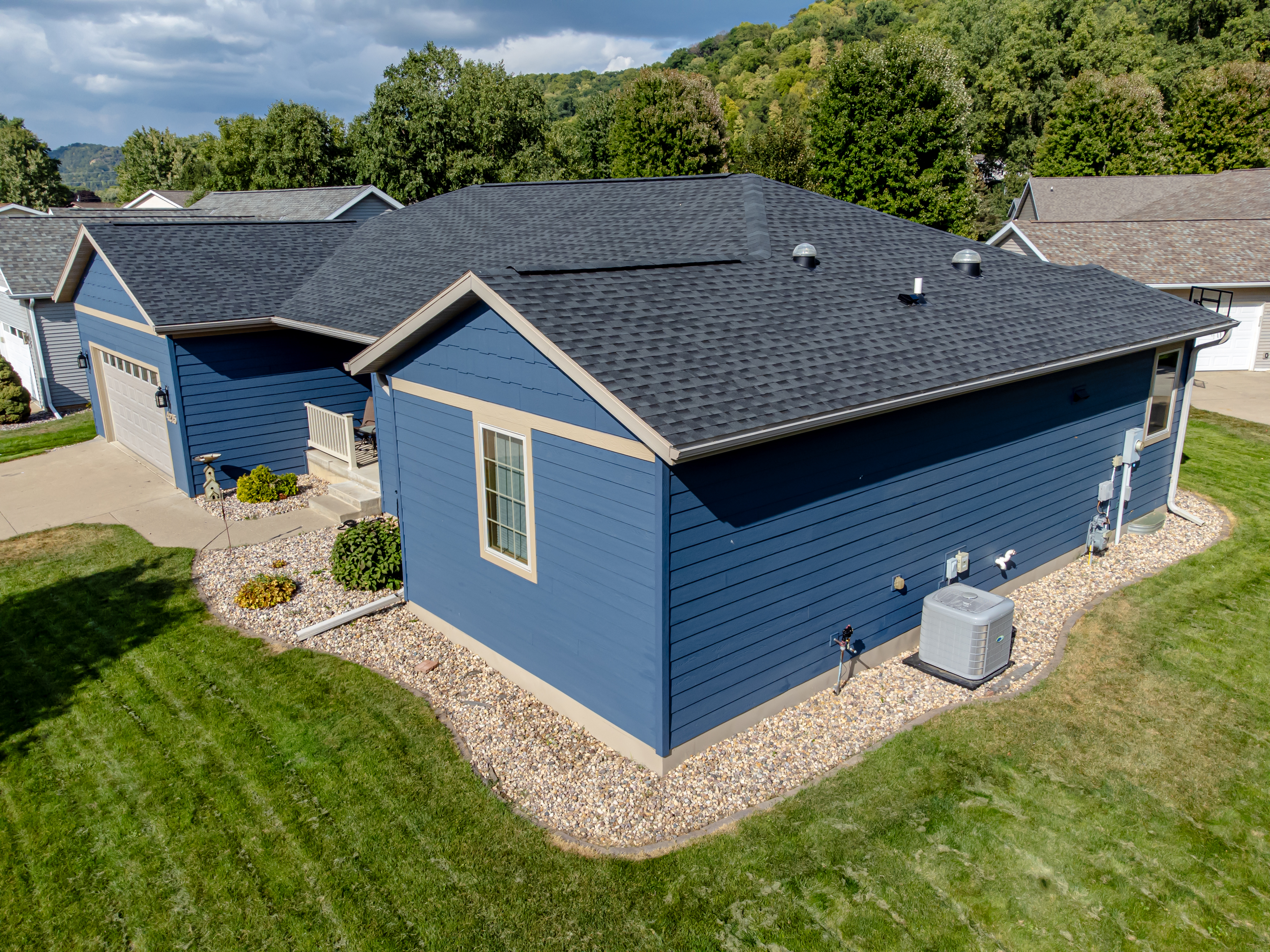
Fiber cement siding and shake shingles under the gable roof

Wood shingles are thin, tapered pieces of wood primarily used to cover roofs and walls of buildings to protect them from the weather. Historically shingles, also known as shakes, were split from straight grained, knot free bolts of wood. Modern shingles are mostly made by being cut which distinguishes them from shakes, which are made by being split out of a bolt.

Wooden shingle roofs were prevalent in the North American colonies (for example in the Cape-Cod-style house) or eastern Europe, while in central and southern Europe at the same time, thatch, slate and tile were the prevalent roofing materials. In rural Scandinavia, wood shingles were a common roofing material until the 1950s. Wood shingles are susceptible to fire and cost more than other types of shingle so they are not as common as in the past.

Distinctive shingle patterns exist in various regions created by the size, shape, and application method. Special treatments such as swept valleys, combed ridges, decorative butt ends, and decorative patterns impart a special character to each building. Wood shingles can also be shaped by steam bending to create a thatch-like appearance, with unique roof details and contours.

== History ==
Historically, wooden shingles were usually thin (3/8 to 3/4 in or 10 to 19 mm), relatively narrow (3 to 8 in or 76 to 203 mm), of varying length (14 to 36 in or 360 to 910 mm), and almost always planed or knifed smooth. The traditional method for making wooden shingles before the 19th century was to rive (hand split) them from straight-grained knot-free sections of logs pre-cut to the desired length known as bolts. These bolts were quartered or split into wedges. A mallet and froe (or axe) were used to split or rive out thin pieces of wood. The wood species varied according to available local woods, but only the more durable heartwood, or inner section, of the log, was usually used. The softer sapwood generally was not used because it deteriorated quickly. Because hand-split shingles were somewhat irregular along the split surface, it was necessary to dress or plane the shingles on a shaving horse with a drawknife or draw-shave to make them fit evenly on the roof. This reworking was necessary to provide a tight-fitting roof over typically open shingle lath or sheathing boards. Dressing, or smoothing of shingles, was almost universal, no matter what wood was used or in what part of the world the building was located, except in those cases where a temporary or very utilitarian roof was needed.

Shingle fabrication was revolutionized in the early 19th century by steam-powered sawmills. Shingle mills made possible the production of uniform shingles in mass quantities. The sawn shingle of uniform taper and smooth surface eliminated the need to hand dress. The supply of wooden shingles was, therefore, no longer limited by local factors. These changes coincided with (and in turn increased) the popularity of architectural styles such as Carpenter Gothic, Queen Anne, and Shingle style architecture that used shingles to great effect.

Hand-split shingles continued to be used in many places well after the introduction of machine sawn shingles. There were other popular roofing materials, and some regions rich in slate had fewer examples of wooden shingle roofs. Some western "boom" towns used sheet metal because it was light and easily shipped. Slate, terneplate, and clay tile were used on ornate buildings and in cities that limited flammable wooden shingles. Wooden shingles, however, were never abandoned. Even in the 20th century, architectural styles such as the Colonial Revival and Tudor Revival used wooden shingles.

== Types ==
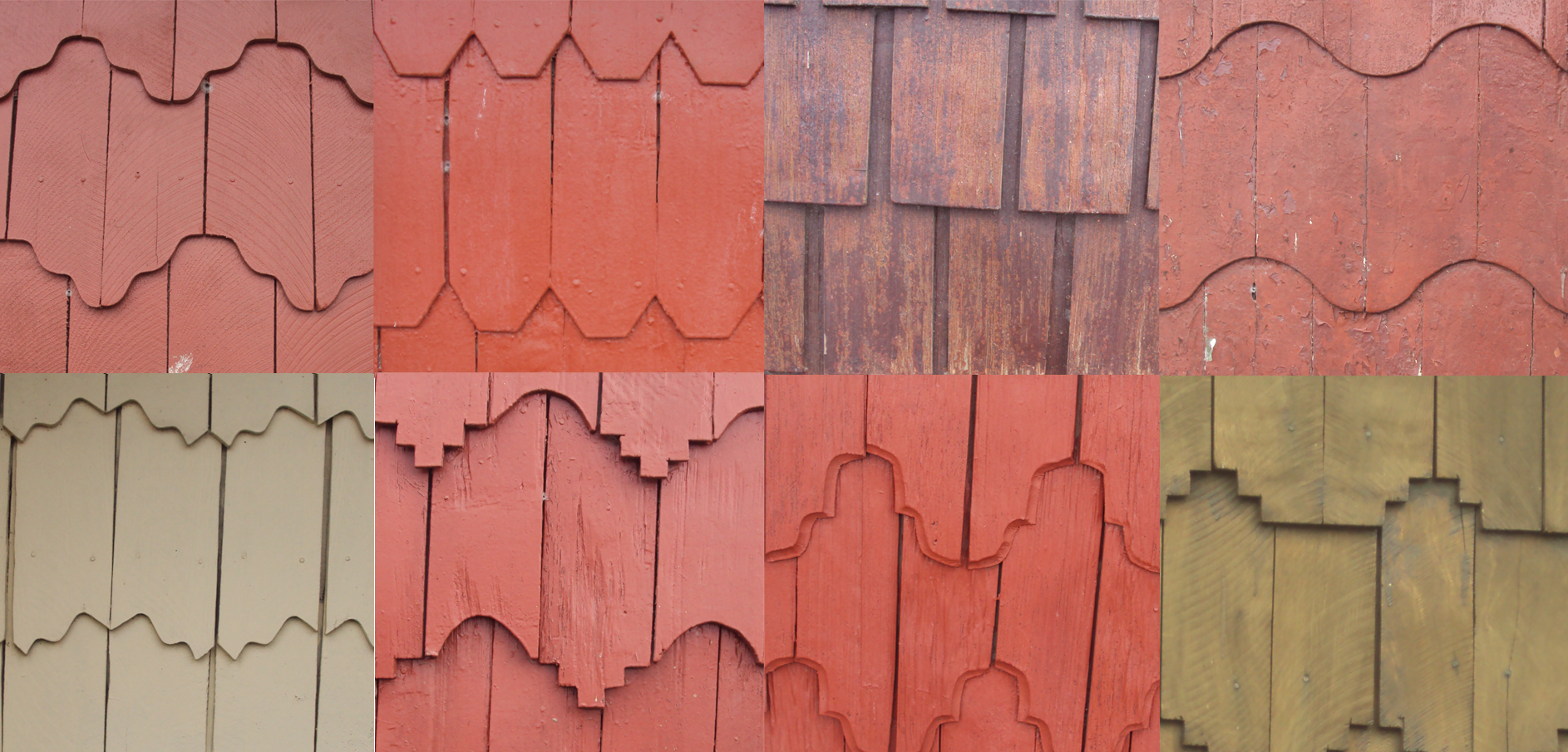
Collage of different styles of wood shingles used in Chiloé architecture

The simplest form of wood shingle is a rectangle about 16 inches (41 cm) long. The sides and butt are often irregular; the sides may taper, and the butt may not be square with the sides. Shingles that have been processed so that the butt is square to the sides are called rebutted and re-squared or rebutted and re-jointed shingles, often abbreviated R&R.

Shingles and shakes may be tapered, straight, split, or sawn, and any combination of these except straight-tapered. Different species and quality of wood are used, as are different lengths and installation methods. Shakes and shingles may also be treated with wood preservatives and fire retardants before or after installation.

=== Shakes ===
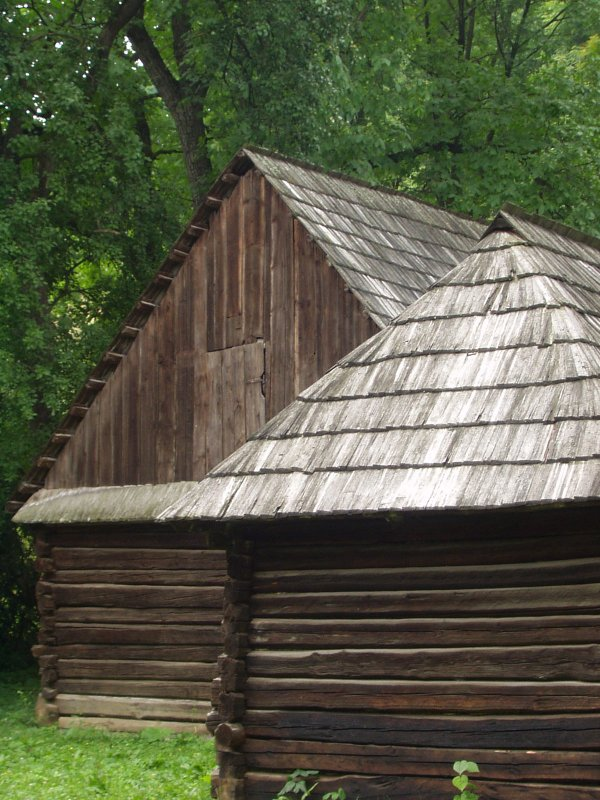
A shake roof in Romania

A shake is a basic wooden shingle made from split logs. Shakes have traditionally been used for roofing and siding applications around the world. Higher-grade shakes are typically used for roofing purposes, while the lower grades are used for siding. In either situation, properly installed shakes provide long-lasting weather protection and a rustic aesthetic, though they require more maintenance than some other more modern weatherproofing systems.

The term shake is sometimes used as a colloquialism for all wood shingles, though shingles are sawn rather than split. In traditional usage, "shake" refers to the board to which the shingle is nailed, not the shingle. Split wooden shingles are referred to as shag shingles.

=== Modern shingles ===
Modern wooden shingles, both sawn and split, continue to be made, but they differ from the historical ones. Modern commercially available shakes are generally thicker than the historic hand-split counterpart and are usually left "undressed" with a rough, corrugated surface. The rough-surface shake is often considered more "rustic" and "historic," but this is a modern fashion.

Some modern shingles are produced in pre-cut decorative patterns, sometimes called fancy-cut shingles, and are available pre-primed for later painting. The sides of rectangular shingles may be re-squared and re-butted, which means they have been reworked so the sides are parallel and the butt is square to the sides. These are more uniform and are installed more neatly as a result.

Shingles are less durable than shakes, particularly in wet climates; shakes are finished with a drawknife or similar tool, which leaves a smooth surface that resists water penetration. This, in turn, slows the softening of wood microorganisms. Also, the method of splitting shakes rather than sawing ensures only straight-grained pieces (which are much stronger and less likely to warp).

=== Recycled rubber shake shingles ===
Modern recycling technologies have allowed the manufacture of rubber shake shingles, made mostly from old tires. These have the same look as a conventional wooden shingle but will not rot, curl, discolor, bend, crack, or take on moisture and will also not allow moisture to escape.

== Production ==
=== Wood selection ===
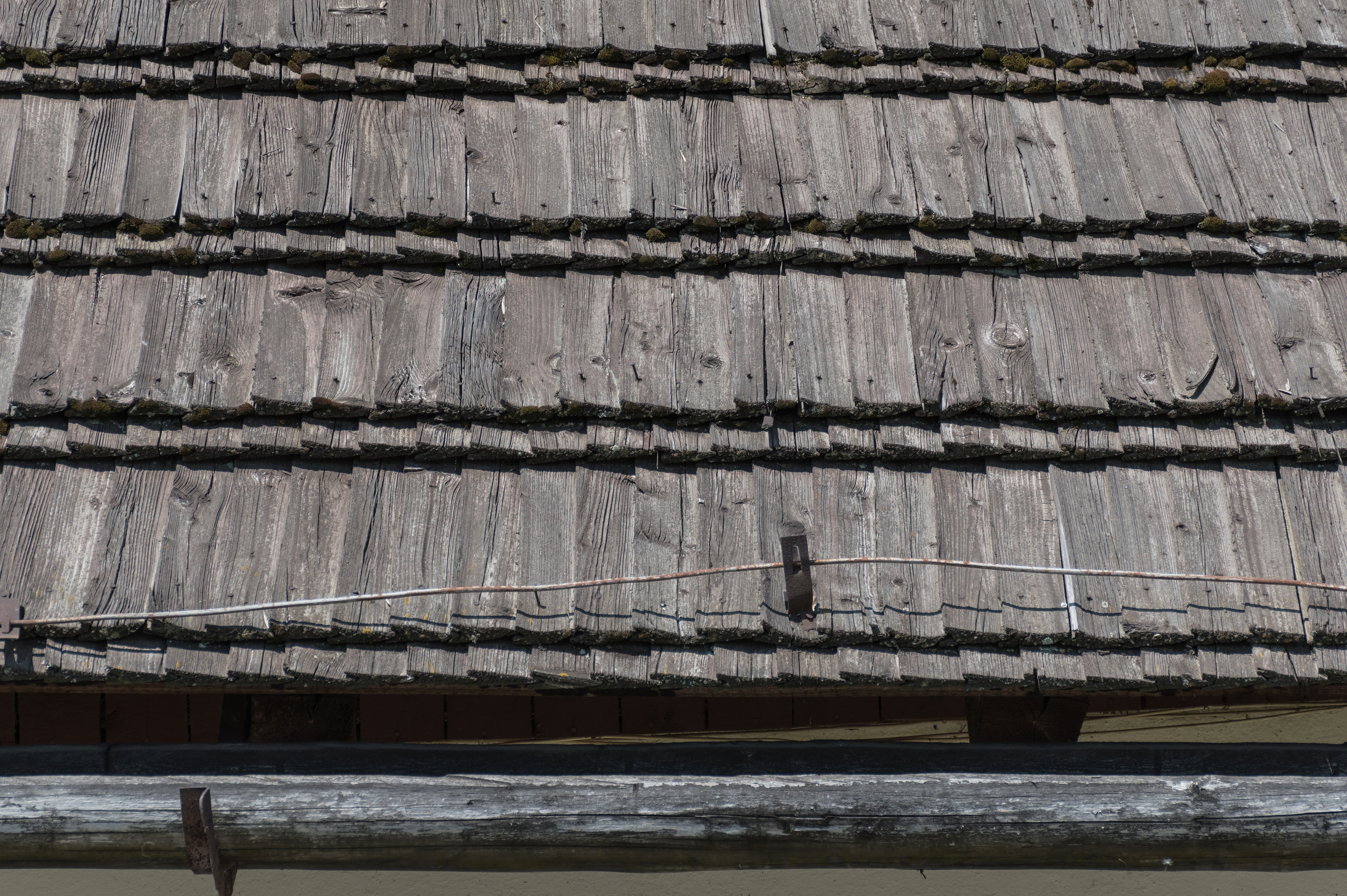
Wooden shakes in Poland

In North America shakes are typically made from California redwood (Sequoia sempervirens), western red cedar (Thuja plicata), and Atlantic white cedar (Chamaecyparis thyoides), while in Scandinavia and Central Europe they are more commonly made from pine (Pinus sylvestris) and local variations of spruce (Picea). There are various types of shakes, the main differentiating feature between shakes and other types of shingles is that shakes are split while most shingles are sawn on all sides. The sizes also vary from country to country; in North America shakes are usually made in 24-inch (610 mm) lengths, the most common; 18-inch (460 mm) barn shake; or even 48-inch (1,200 mm) shakes, which are typically used for siding. In Scandinavia shakes, traditionally used only for roofing, are generally smaller than in North America, measuring 13–16 inches (330–410 mm) long, 4–6 inches (100–150 mm) wide and 1/8 inch (3.2 mm) thick, while in Poland and Slovakia they are usually 36 inches (910 mm) long, 4–6 inches (100–150 mm) wide and 1–1.25 inches (25–32 mm) thick. Likewise wooden shingles are manufactured in differing lengths, in North America, 16, 18 and 24 inches (410, 460 and 610 mm).

In Latvia, wooden shakes were defined in a 1933 national standard as 70 centimetres (28 in) long, 7.5 centimetres (3.0 in) wide and 8.5 millimetres (0.33 in) thick. They are a product of planing or running a knife along a log. The most popular shake wood in Latvia is aspen, before other softwoods like pine(!).

=== Log handling and transportation ===
On the left is a log that fell in 1920; in the foreground, a ringer bucked from the log is being trimmed to remove waste; on the right is a finished sling of blocks.

Logs are typically cut into appropriate lengths using a chainsaw, then the "ringers" or cuts are split with an axe into cubes which are small enough to handle, usually 45 to 204 kilograms (100 to 450 lb), then stacked on a rope. The rope is looped around the stacked wood, and the ends passed through an eye spliced in the end. When the running end is pulled, it tightens the "sling" rope around the blocks preventing them from falling out. The slings are then flown to a central location to be loaded on pallets for transport. Previously, swede saws, crosscut saws and hand saws may have been used to cut the logs, and a froe (a heavy blade 24 in [610 mm] long and 3 in [76 mm] wide with a handle at one end perpendicular to the blade) was used to split the ringers. This blade was driven into the wood using a mallet, then the wood could be pried apart by pulling on the handle if it would not split by driving the blade in alone.

Before helicopters came into common use for transporting the slings, they were sometimes processed in the bush and finished, hand-split shakes were carried out in a pack frame. In steep areas, cables were strung along the slope to form a tight line or tyrolean. Staples were driven into a block straddling the cable, and the block was slid down the cable to a landing accessible to a boat or truck.

=== Cutting ===
Both shakes and shingles must be edge grain cut to prevent warping and splitting as the wood dries. When splitting blocks and manufacturing shakes or shingles, particular care must be taken to consider the orientation of the grain in the wood. Likewise, when bucking, care must be taken to ensure cuts are precisely perpendicular to the grain to minimize waste and maintain product quality. When bucking, the log must be cleared off well, so the grain can be seen clearly, allowing straight cuts perpendicular to the grain. When splitting, the ringers are typically split from the bark to the heart, perpendicular to the grain. The heartwood is removed by splitting parallel to the grain, and the bark and sap-wood and any imperfections such as rot or bug holes are removed. The initial split is always made on a knot, burl, check or other imperfection, to allow the blocks to be made as large as possible while disposing of any waste. The blocks should never be split where there is clear wood, or imperfections will be left in the block, or the block will have to be split too small in the process of removing flaws.

Canting a log

When cutting large logs or severely twisted pieces, it is often necessary to "cant" or split the entire log into "slabs." A ringer is removed at each end of the tree to split a log, exposing the interior. Wedges are driven into the face to split off a slab, usually on a natural check or imperfection, which runs the entire length of the log. After the face begins to separate, wedges are driven into the resultant opening, starting very near the face and progressively working toward the other end of the log in small steps.

Slab split from log

Tiny Swedish shakes factory

=== Manufacture of shakes and shingles from block form ===
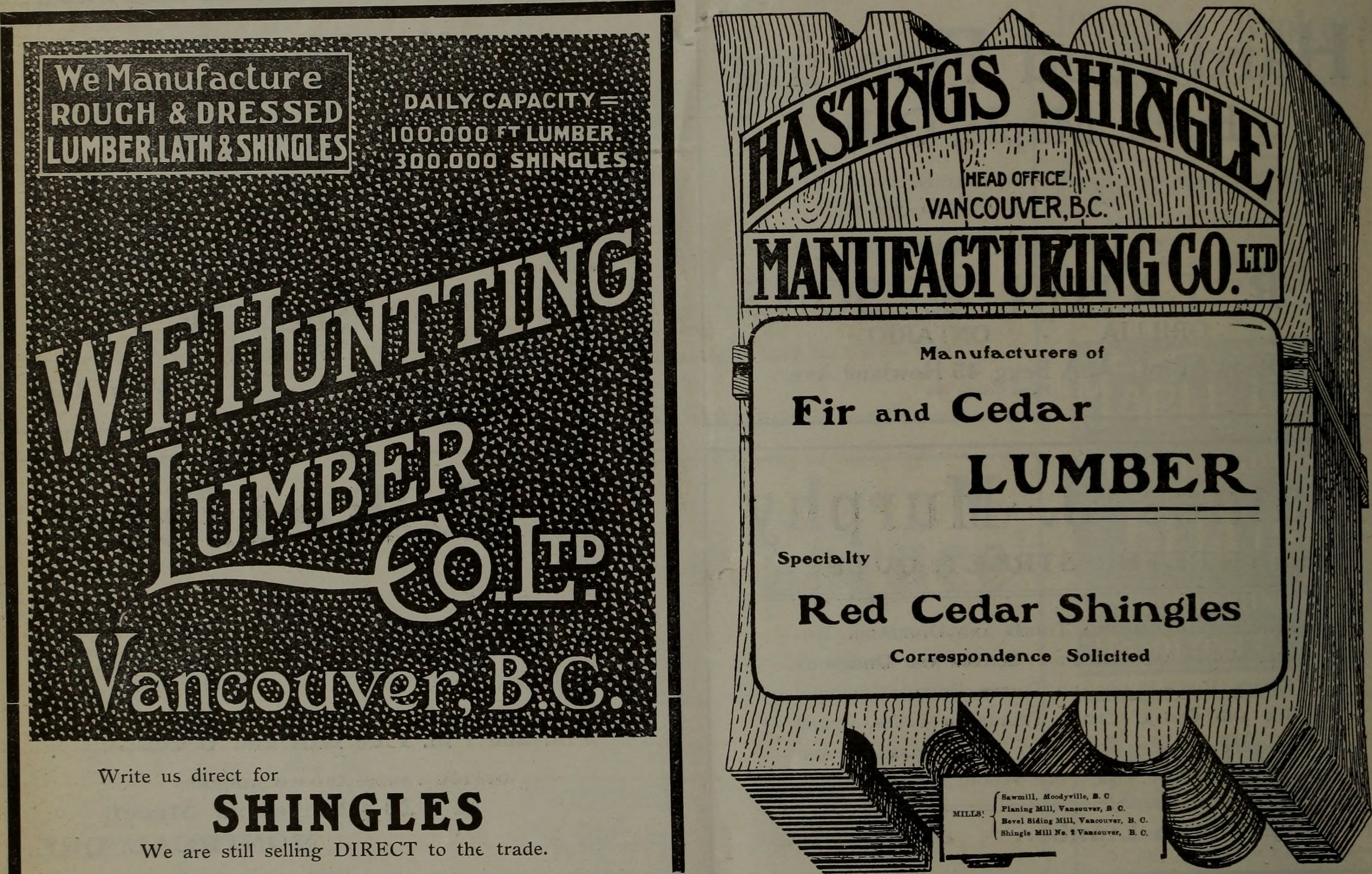
Advertisements from Canadian Forest Industries (1908)

Shake blocks are split into 1-inch-thick (25 mm) slats called blanks, using either a hydraulic press with a blade attached, called a cuber, or split by hand using a froe and mallet. These blanks are uniform in thickness throughout if split from the same edge without flipping the block. Alternatively, the splitter may flip the block after a blank is taken off each edge, which results in a tapered split from end to end, called tapers or hand-split. The blanks which are not tapered require further processing before application to create this taper and are run through a large band saw, pushed by hand to cut them from corner to corner forming a tapered shake, sawn on one face.

Shingles are cut from the blocks using a circular saw, typically 42–48 inches (1.1–1.2 m) in diameter. The blocks are clamped in a carriage that slides back and forth across the blade, tilting and moving the block closer to the blade, with each pass automatically forms a tapered cut of the correct thickness. The shingle edges are then cut with another circular saw called a "trim saw" to remove irregular edges. The result is a tapered shingle sawn on all six sides. The thickness of the butt, or thicker end of the tapered cut, is usually 3/8 inch (9.5 mm) thick but is also commonly made to be 5/8 inch (16 mm), and can be made to any custom specifications.

== Chiloé, Chile ==
Nearly all the houses and buildings in colonial Chiloé Archipelago, Chile, were built with wood, and roof shingles were extensively employed in Chilota architecture. Roof shingles of Fitzroya came to be used as money called Real de Alerce.

== Gallery ==
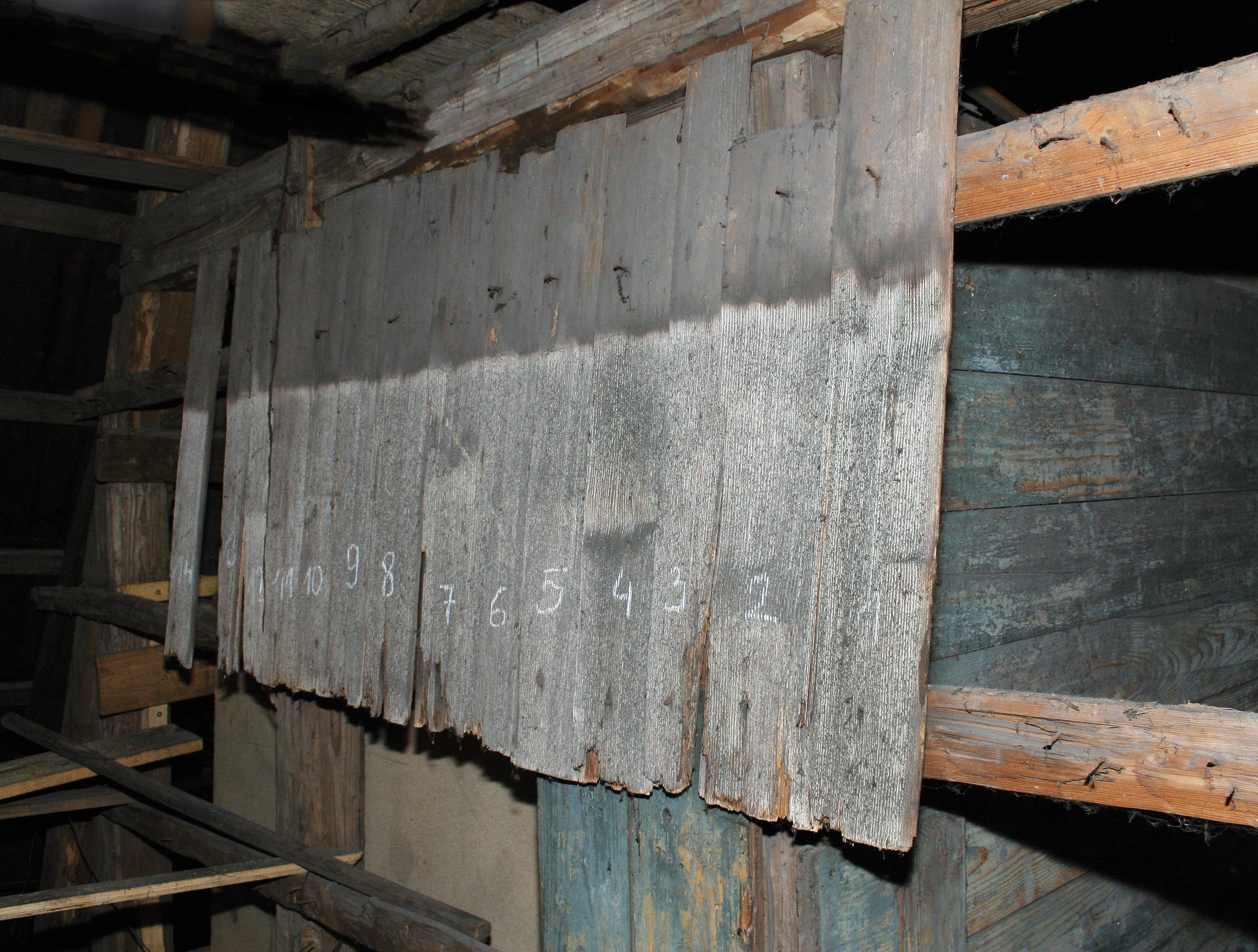
Wood shingles (Fir = Abies alba Mill.) from the year 1467 in the All Saints Church in Laziska, Upper Silesia, Poland

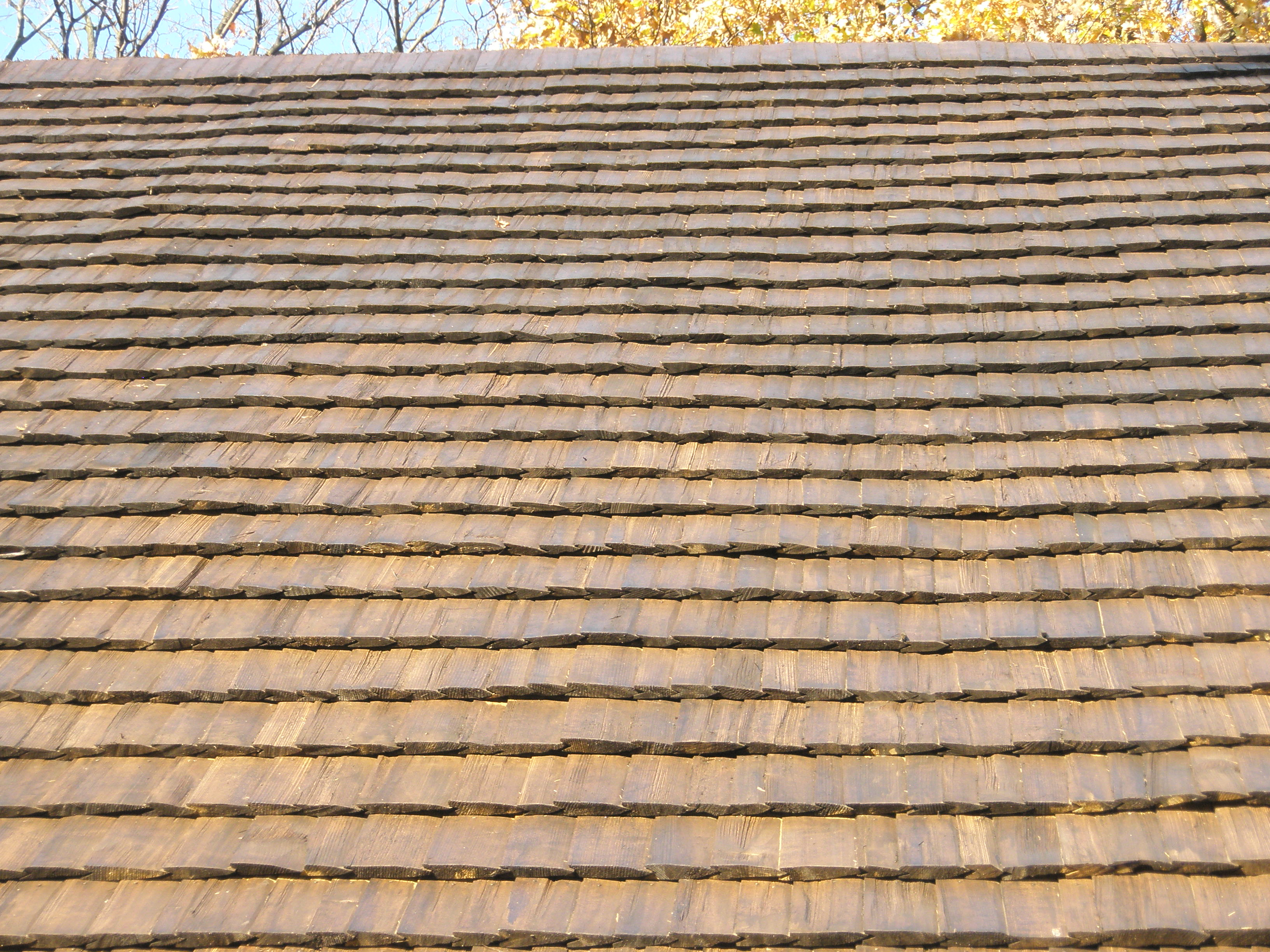
Church of Corpus Christi, Gutz, Czech Republic; detail of shingle roof

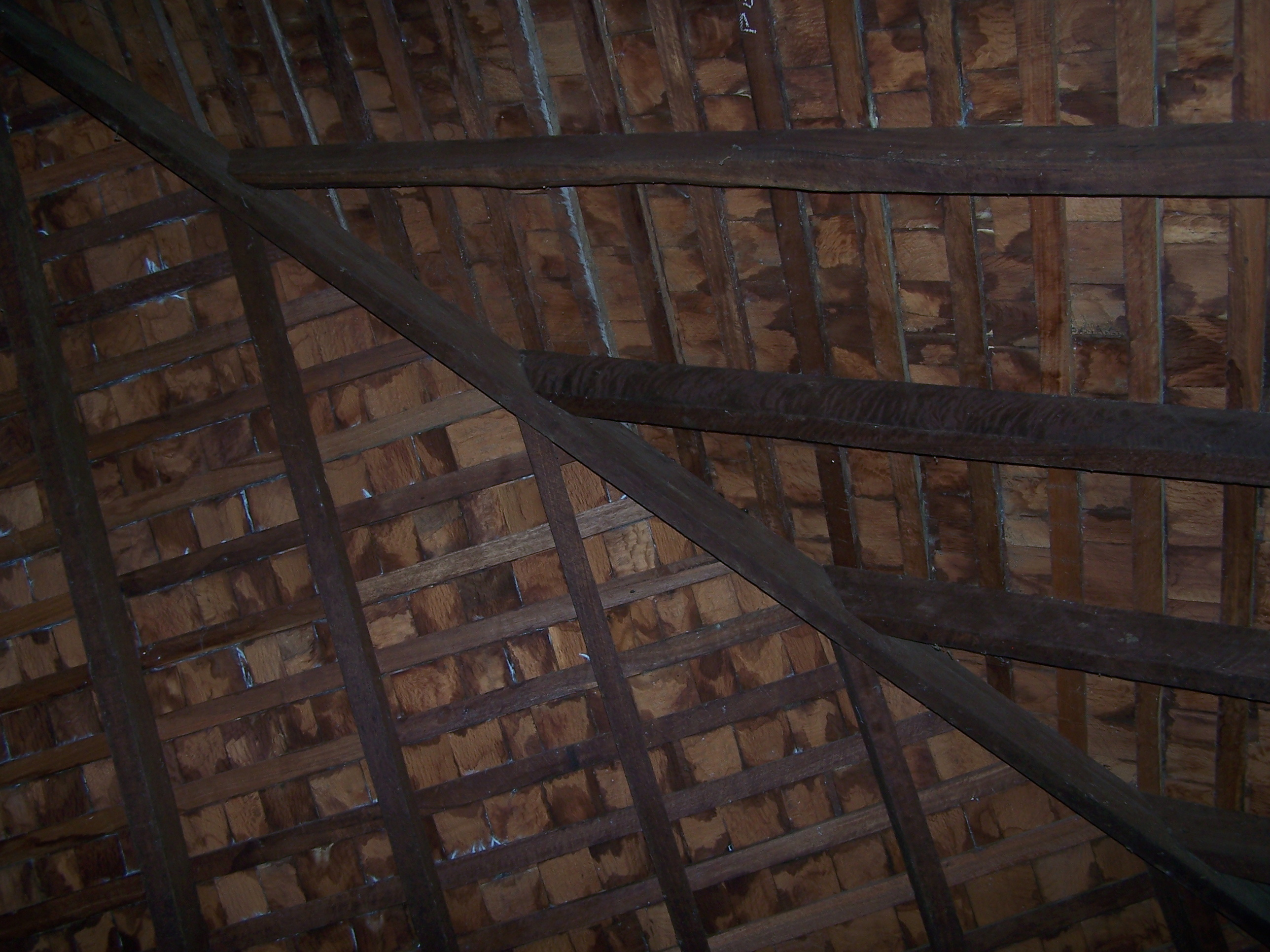
View of the under-side of wood shingle roof installed on strapping; Tranby House, Western Australia

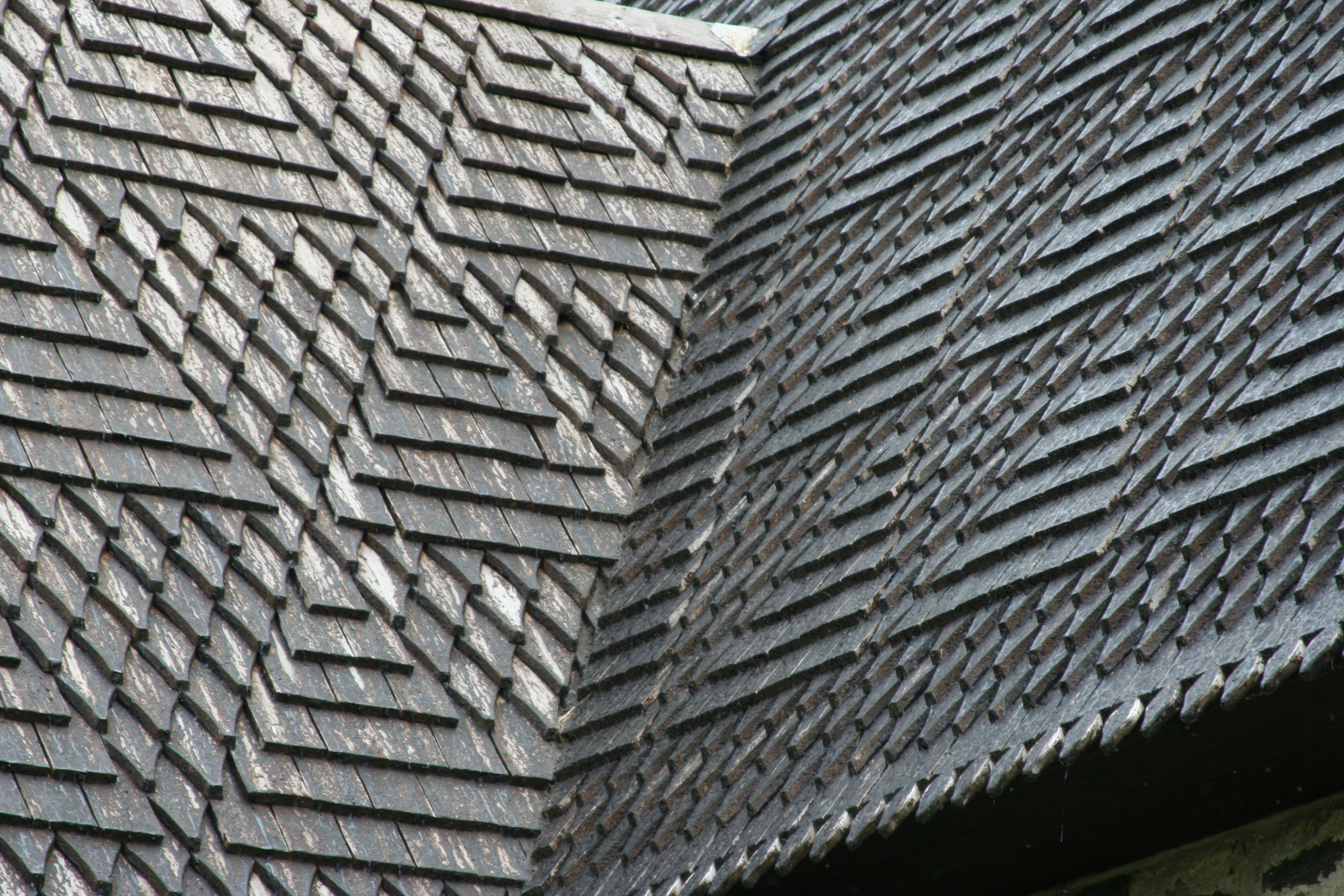
This highly decorative roof has a "closed valley": the valley where the two roofs meet is completely shingled and has metal flashing below the wood to prevent leaks. St. Olaf's Church in Tyrvää, Sastamala, Finland.

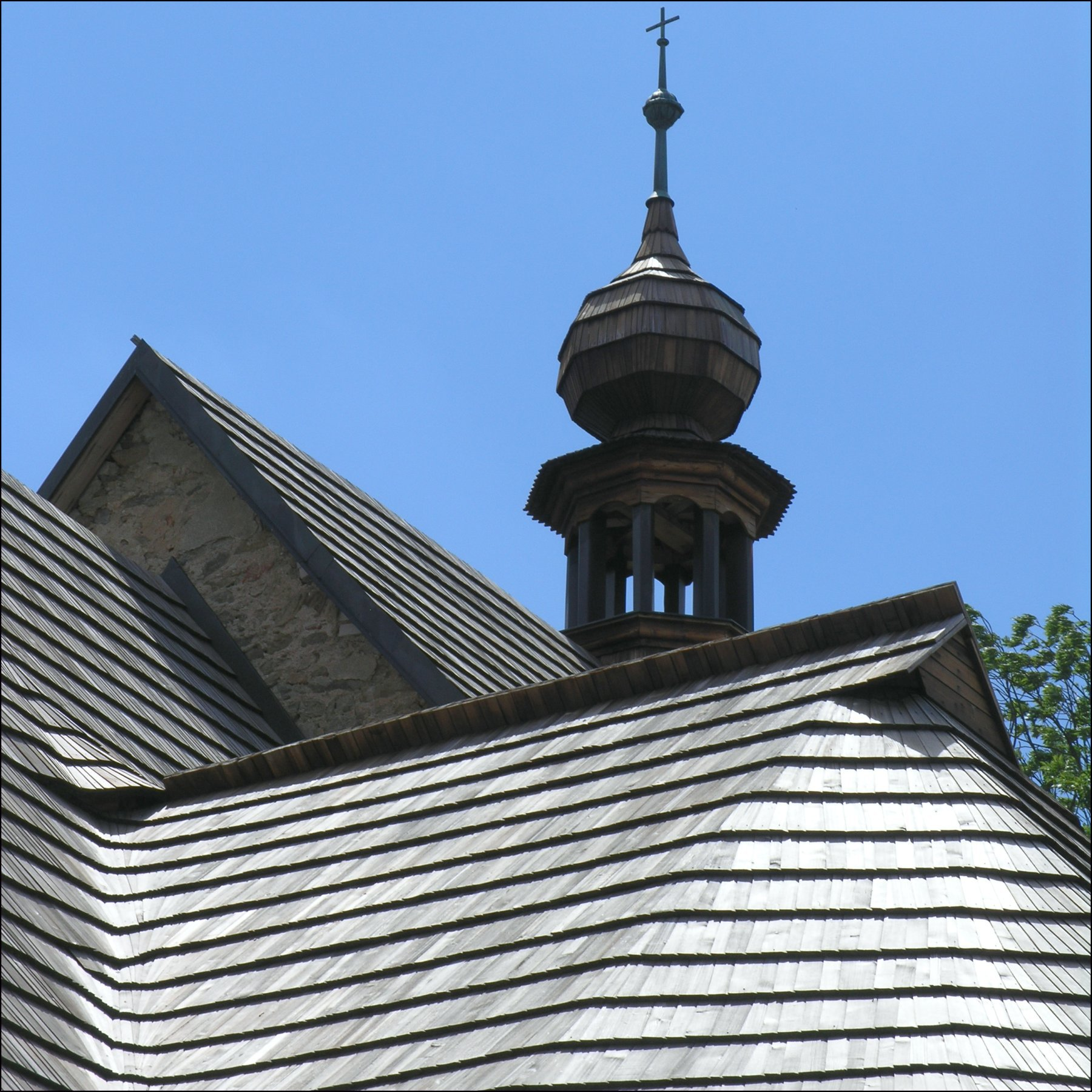
A swept valley on the Church of Saint Martin, Dolní Město, Czech Republic

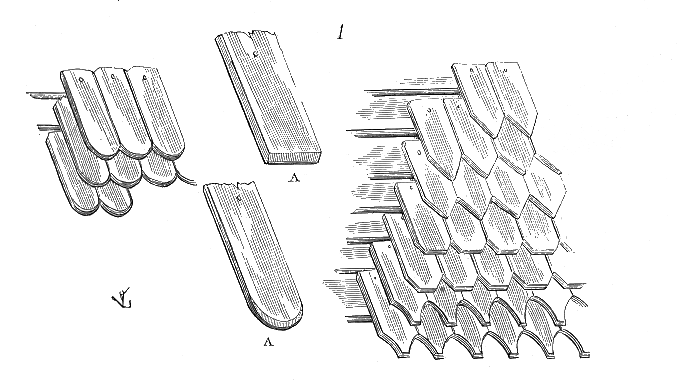
Decorative shingles are more uniform in size and installed in repeating patterns. Illustration from Dictionnaire raisonné de l'architecture française du XIe au XVIe siècle by Viollet-Le-Duc, 1856.

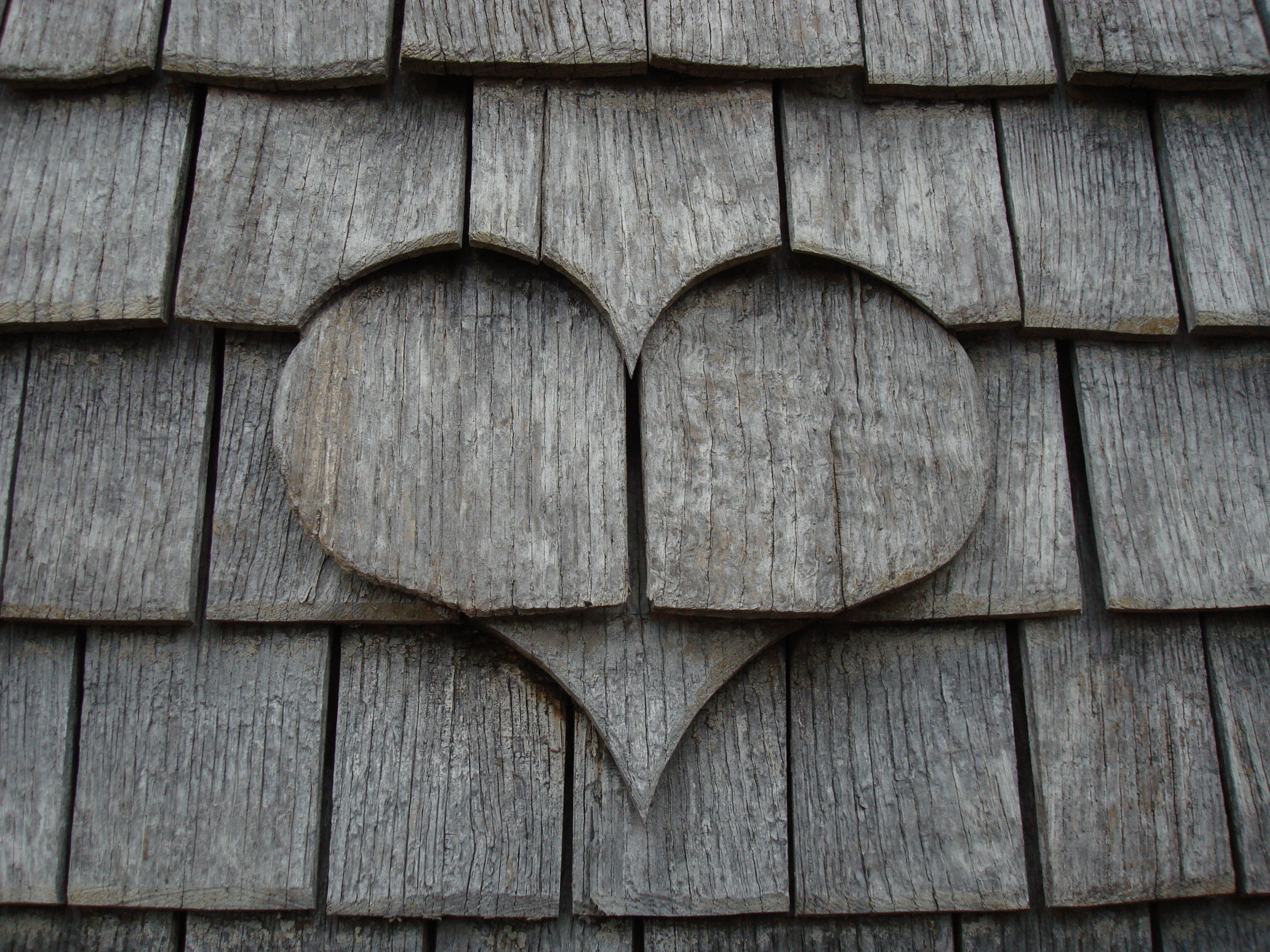
Artistic patterns are possible.

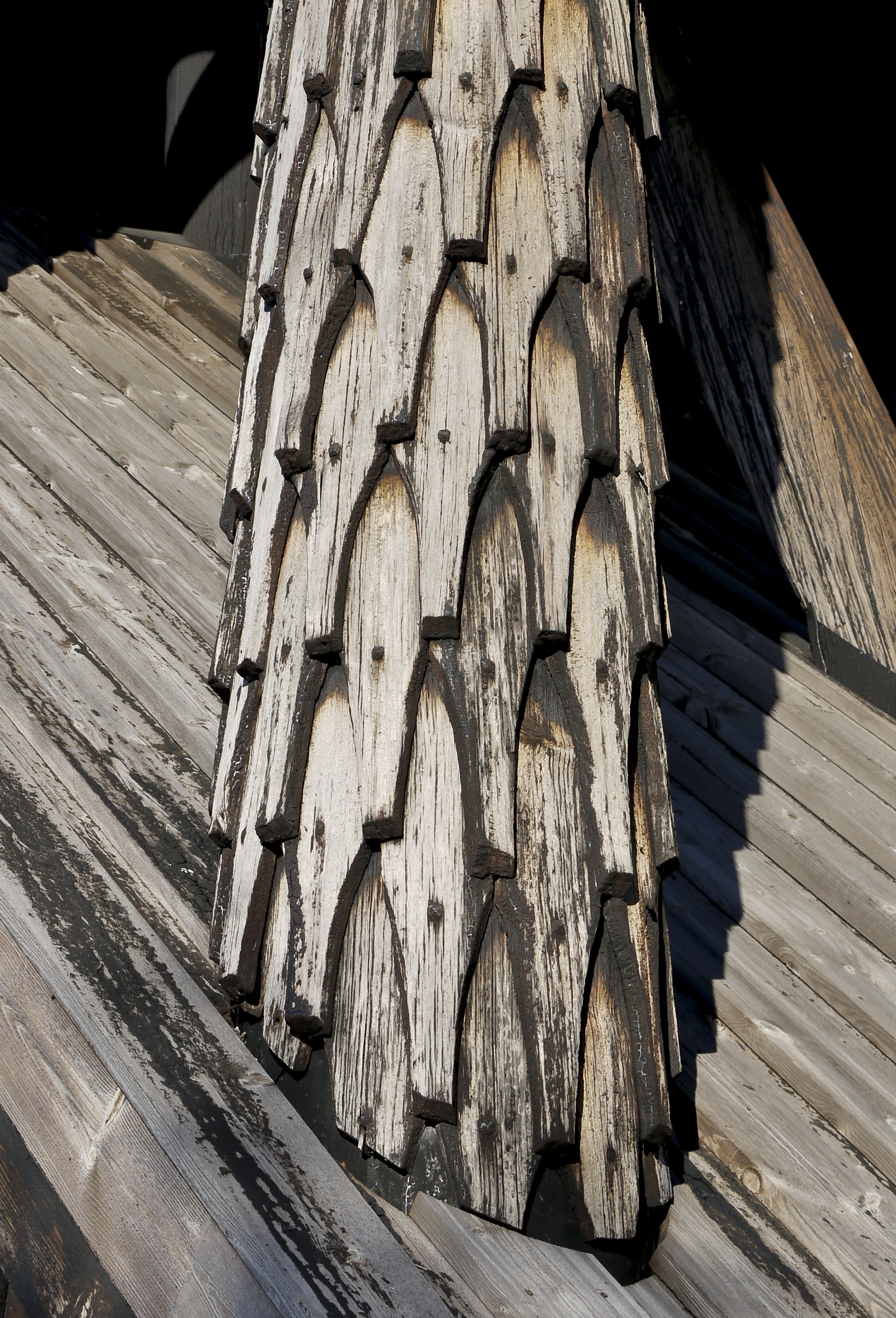
Face nailed shingles on the bell tower of Frösö Church, Frösön, Jämtland County, Sweden

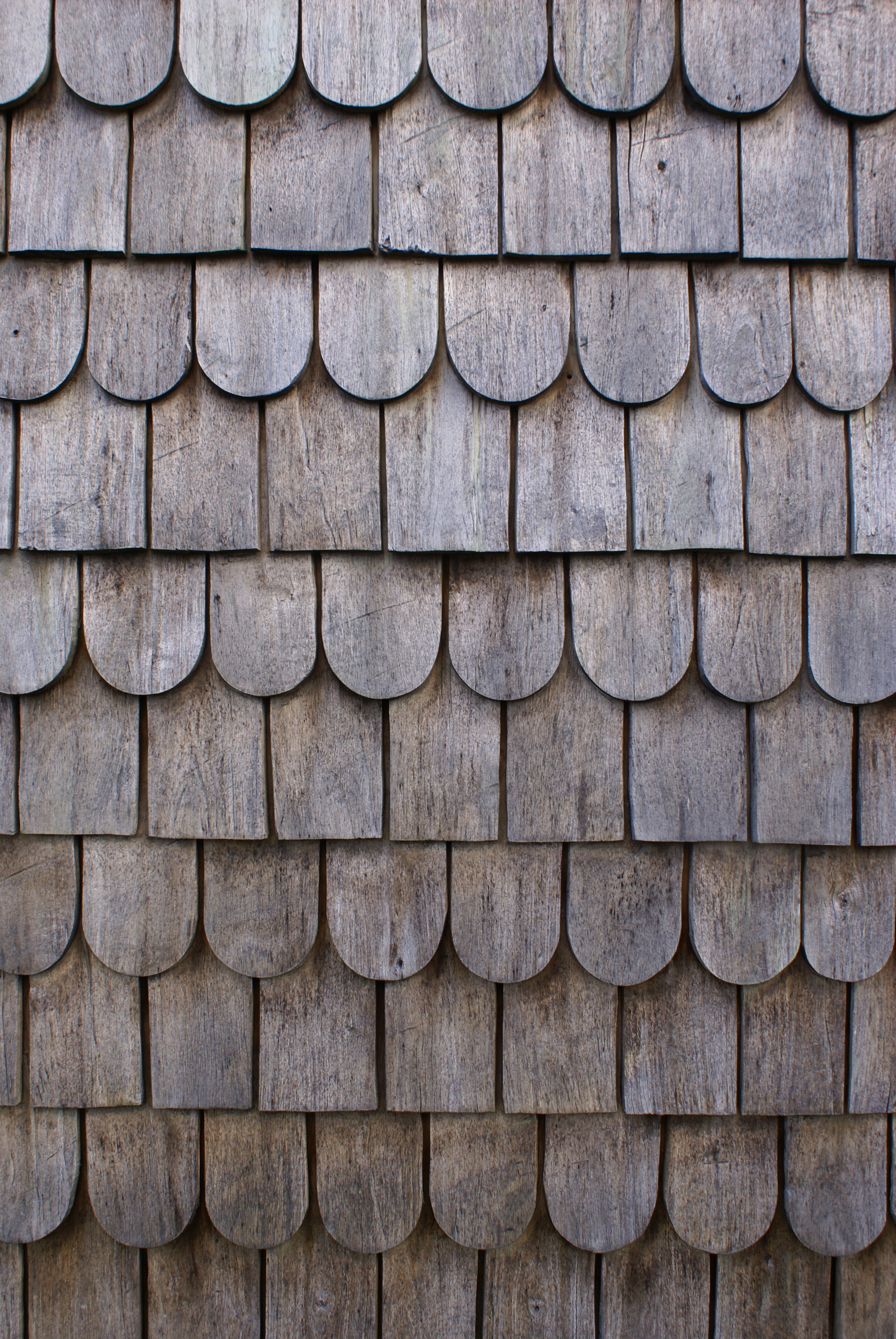
Shingles made from Acacia heterophylla wood, Réunion island

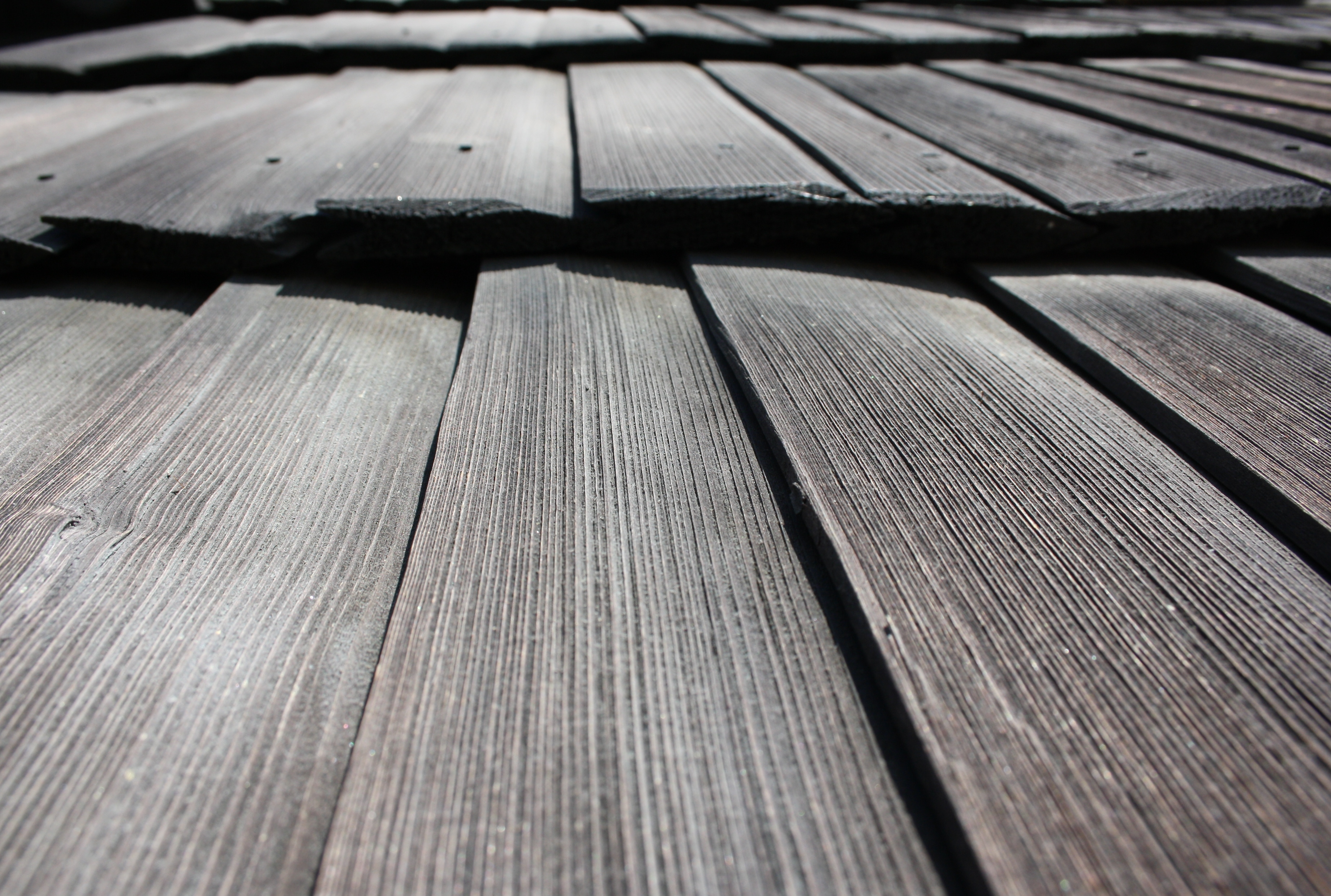
Close-up view of shingles on the Church of Exaltation of the Cross in Bystřice, Frýdek-Místek District, Moravian-Silesian Region, Czech Republic)

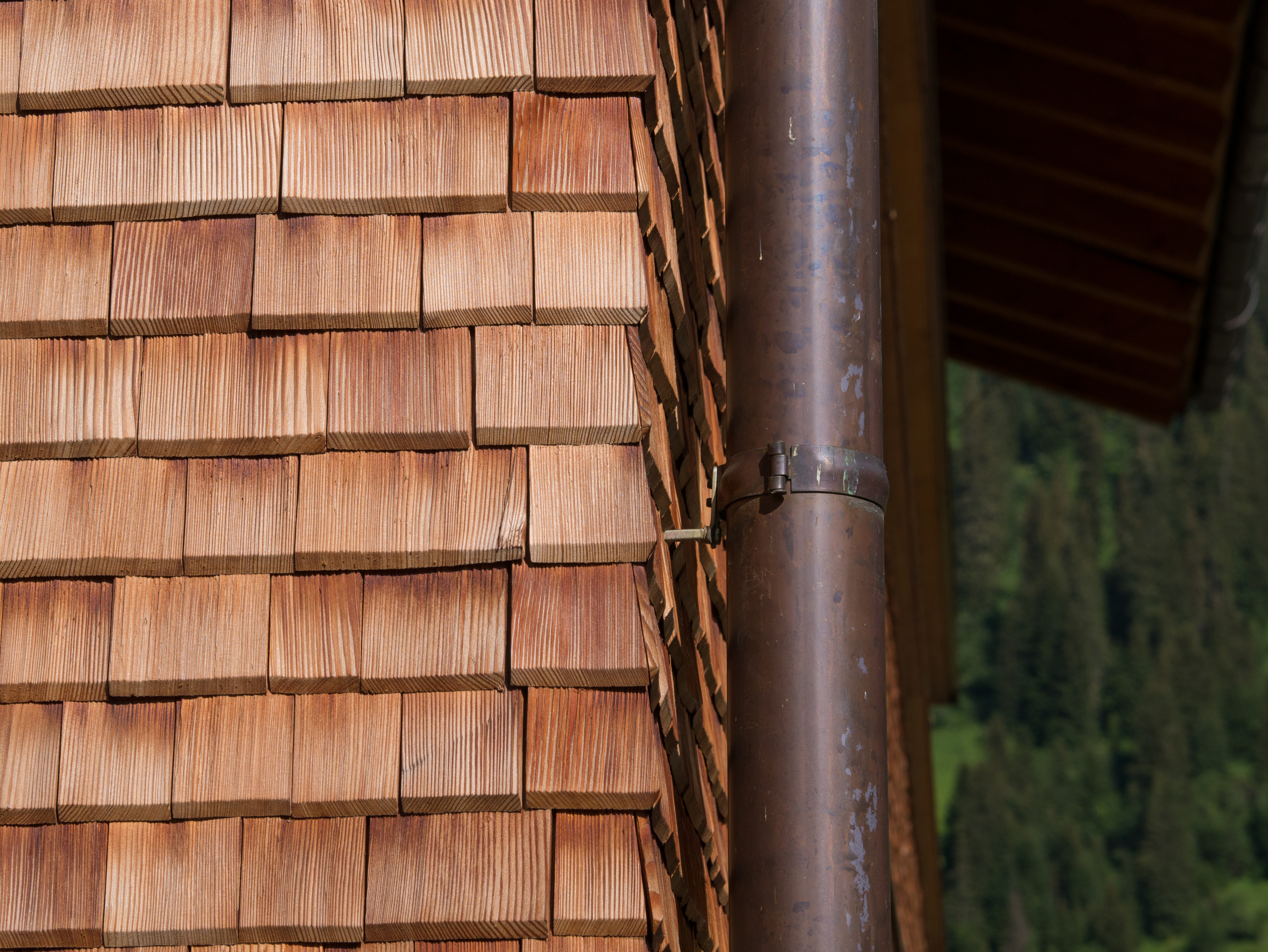
Details of a wooden shingle façade in Lech, Austria

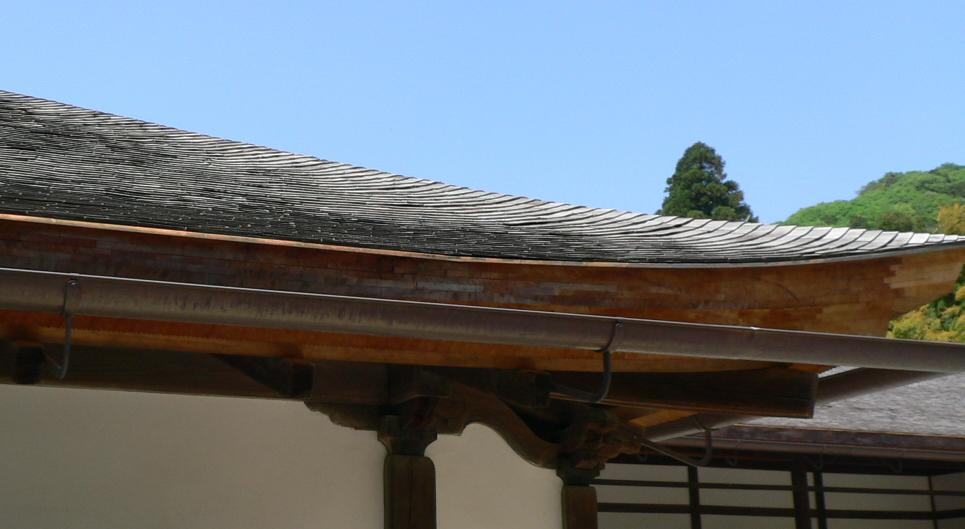
A part of the wooden shingle roof of Ginkaku-ji, in Japan

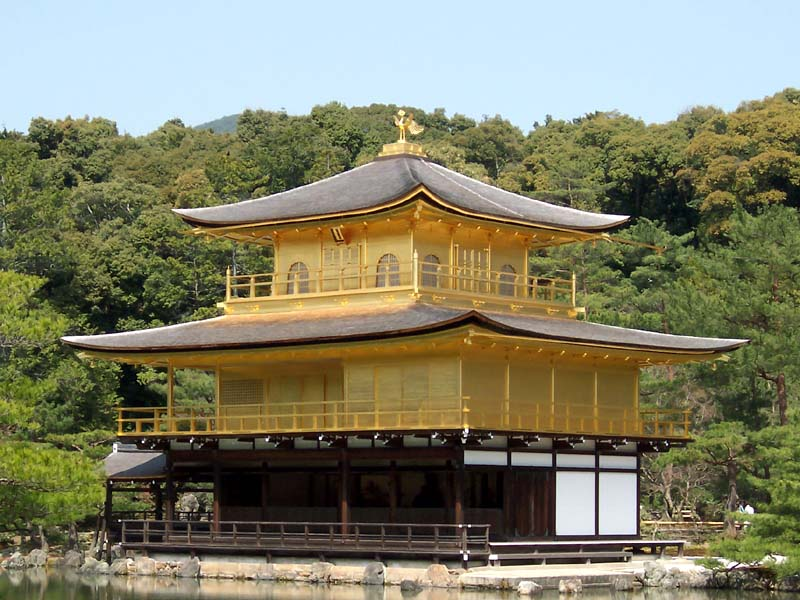
Kinkaku-ji is roofed with wood shingles, Kyoto, Japan.

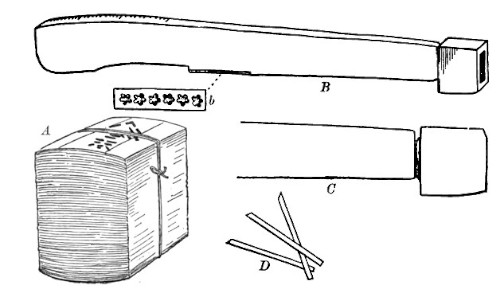
Japanese wood shingles, bamboo nails and a special hammer. The shingles are always split, and are very thin.

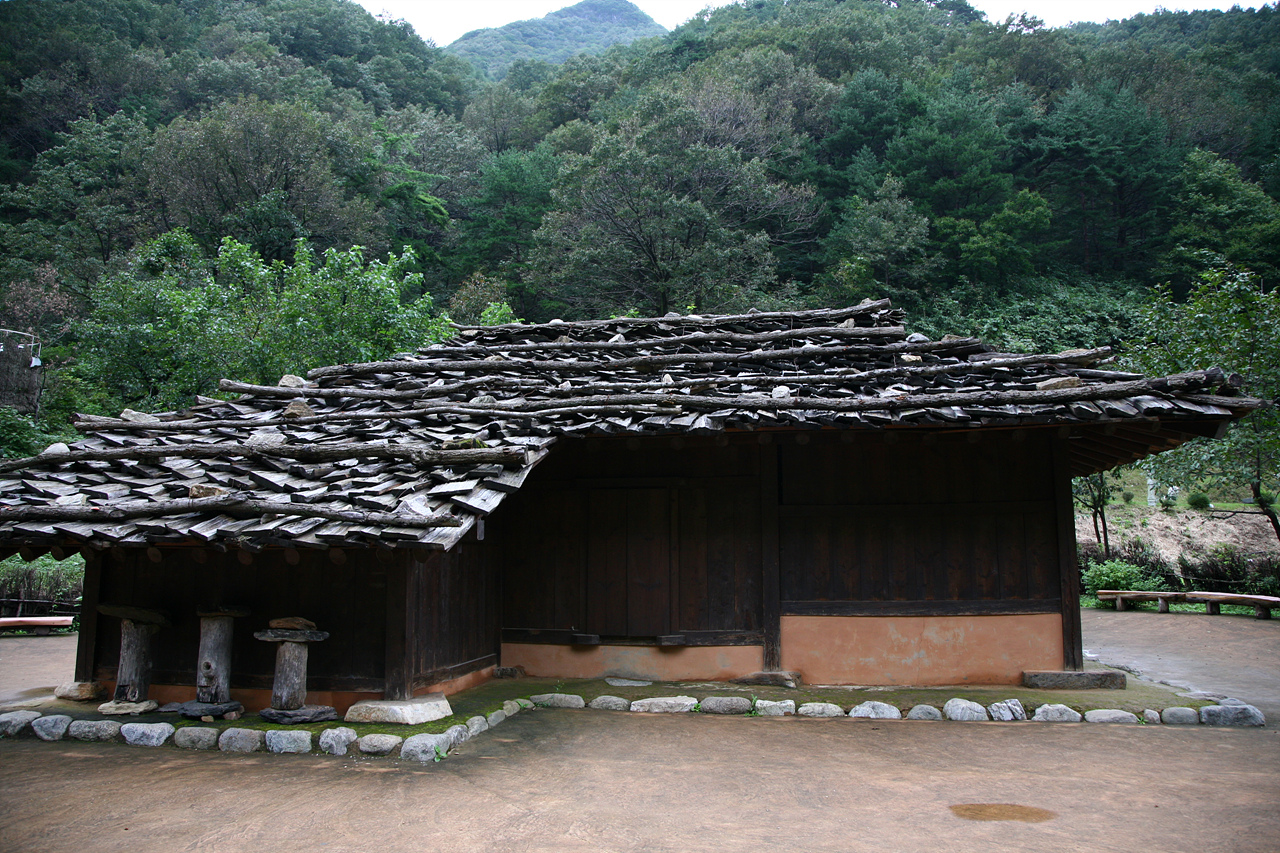
Korean wood shingles, Samcheok, Gangwon Province, South Korea

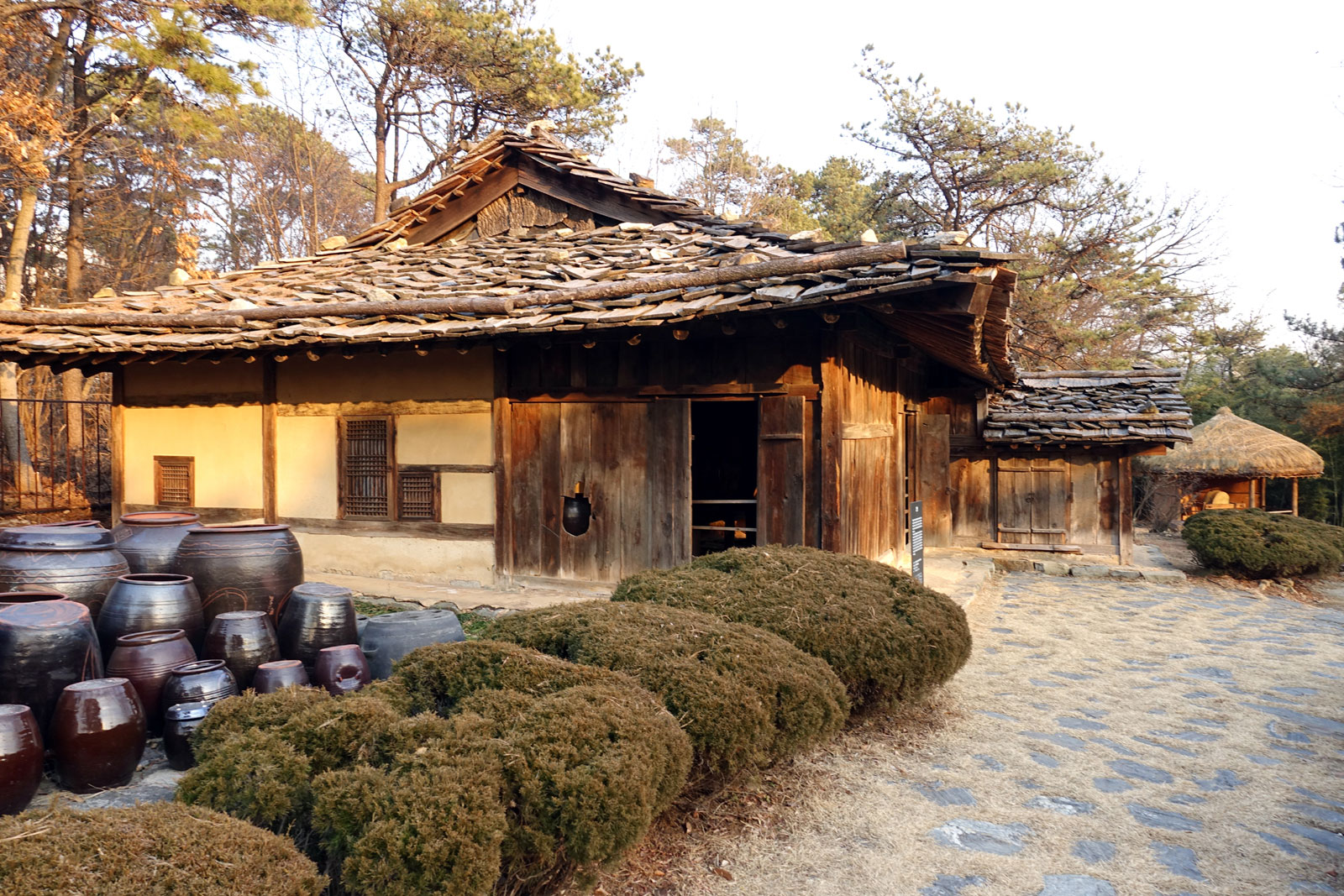
Korean Wood shingle, Neowa-jip, Asan, Gyeonggi Province in South Korea

== See also ==
- Redcedar bolt
- Roof shingle
- Shingle style architecture
- Stave church
- Covering (construction)
