= White ring =

White ring may refer to:

- a ring with a white gemstone
- White Ring arena, sports arena in Japan
- White power ring ("White Ring") of the White Lantern Corps
- Nenya, the White Ring, one of the Three Rings of Elven Kings under the Sky
- White Ring, a German male Catholic student fraternity
- White Ring (band)
- The White Ring (ski circuit), ski circuit in Austria
- a white ring worn on the left middle finger as a symbol of the aromantic community
