= Literaricum Lech =

- Genre: Literature, anthropology
- Locations: Lech am Arlberg, Vorarlberg
- Country: Austria
- Established: 2021
- Organiser: Nicola Steiner

The Literaricum Lech is a literary conference in Lech am Arlberg in Vorarlberg (Austria). Its aim is to discuss classic as well as contemporary literature in a way that is accessible, innovative and diverting. It has premiered from 8 to 10 July 2021.

== Organisation ==
The Swiss-German cultural journalist Nicola Steiner is responsible for the organisation and conception of the Literaricum Lech. She is advised by the Vorarlberg writer Michael Köhlmeier, co-initiator of the Philosophicum Lech, as well as the equally renowned Austrian writer and literary scholar Raoul Schrott.

The Literaricum Lech will arrange classic literary discussions as well as children's and youth literature and poetry slams with the goal to provide a clear and accessible approach to literature.

It is intended that each edition of the Literaricum Lech has a classic piece of world literature put into focus. This classic can but doesn't have to be picked up on throughout the festival. In 2021, Daniel Kehlmann gave the opening speech on Simplicius Simplicissimus by the Baroque poet Hans Jakob Christoffel von Grimmelshausen.

The 2022 edition of the event was dedicated to Herman Melville. The 2024 edition revolved around the book Lolita by Vladimir Nabokov.

== Poeta Laureatus ==
Since 2023 a poet laureate is selected by a committee initiated by Raoul Schrott with support by the Zürs Tourism Board. The winner receives prize money of 15.000 euros. In return, he is obliged to publish a poem every month during a year dealing with current events for the festival's media partners ORF, Der Standard, SWR and Die Welt. The first winner of the prize was German writer Michael Krüger.

- 2023: Michael Krüger
- 2024: Clemens J. Setz

== See also ==
- Medicinicum Lech
- Philosophicum Lech
