= Zürs =

- Zuers
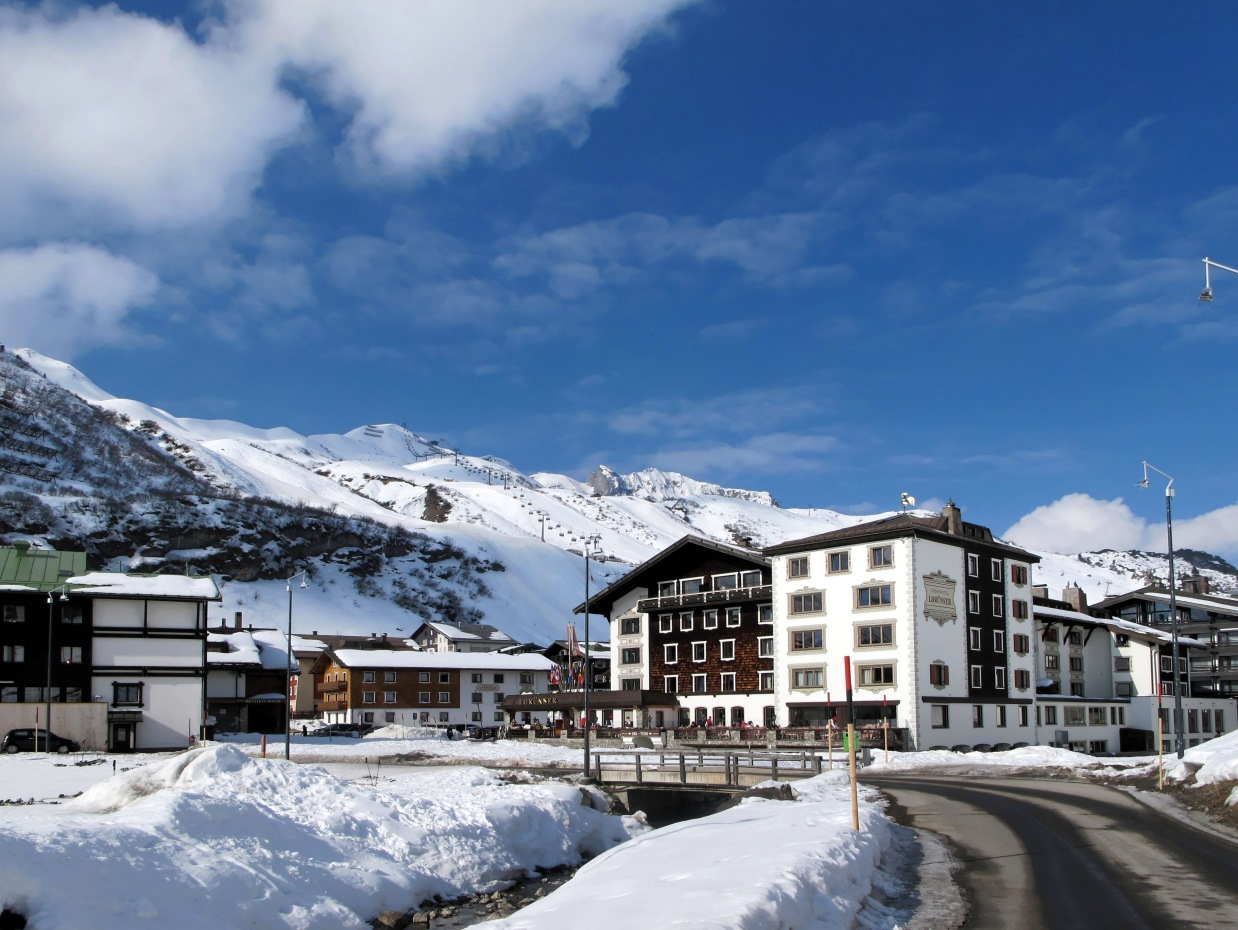
- Interactive map of Zürs
- Coordinates: 47°10′8″N 10°9′48″E
- Country: Austria
- State: Vorarlberg
- District: Bludenz
- Elevation: 1,716 m (5,630 ft)

Population
  - Total: 154
- Time zone: Central European Time
- Postal code: 6763

Zürs (1716 meters above sea level) is one of the most renowned winter sports resorts in the Alps. Located in the westernmost Austrian state of Vorarlberg, almost directly on the border to North Tyrol, near the Flexenpass, Zürs is part of the Arlberg region, which also includes Lech, Oberlech, Zug, and Stubenbach. This region offers 87 ski-lifts, 200 kilometers of deep snow slopes and 305 km of ski runs. It has several (mostly luxurious) hotels and guest houses, with a total of over 1,700 beds. It is popular for its downhill skiing, but also for its backcountry skiing and its Olympic ski championships. About four kilometers north of Zürs is Lech am Arlberg, another ski resort which is linked to Zürs not only via road, but also via ski lifts and pistes.

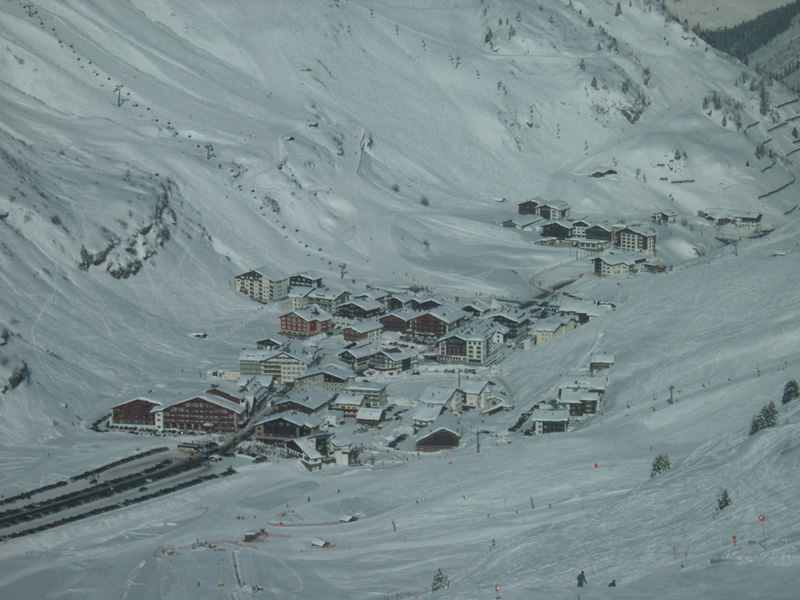
Zürs in Vorarlberg, Austria

== History ==
Until the 20th century, mountain farmers without access roads lived in difficult conditions in this high alpine region. They lived very isolated from the outside world. With the construction of the road over the Flexenpass in 1897, the village was connected to the larger Vorarlberg/Austrian road network. Zürs then became increasingly popular with skiers. Several hotels and guesthouses were built between 1923 and 1931. By 1938 the village had 500 guest beds.

Together with Emil Doppelmayr, Sepp Bildstein designed the first ski lift for the region. In 1937, Austria's first T-bar lift was built on the practice slope in Zürs. During World War II, a second lift was built on the Schlegelkopf near Lech. In the 1950s, the Lech-Zürs ski area began to develop with chair lifts. The Kriegerhorn lift was opened in 1951. In 1957 the Rüfikopf cable car was completed, providing a ski link between Lech and Zürs.

- The White Ring: Thanks to this new lift system, the famous "White Ring" ski circuit, which runs through the villages of Lech, Zürs, Zug and Oberlech, was established.
- The Green Ring: The Green Ring is a three-day hiking trail that tells the story of local people, their traditional culture, and the landscape. This LEADER-Project with the art concept of story and installations, was created by the two artists Daniela Egger and Daniel Kocher. The trail leads the hiker on a track of legends and stories about local inhabitants and events in this multi-faceted natural landscape. Families can solve riddles about the region from Lech up to the Rud-Alpe.

Over time, more modern lifts and hotels have been built in Zürs. Currently, there are 17 hotels and guesthouses (mostly 4-5 star hotels).

In 1959 the movie "Peter schießt den Vogel ab" with Peter Alexander was shot in Zürs. In 2018, the ORF Landkrimi Das letzte Problem (The last problem) was filmed.

== Tourism & economy ==
Zürs is part of the municipality of Lech am Arlberg and is one of the cradles of skiing. The first skiing course was held in Zürs in 1906 and Austria's first ski lift built in Zürs in 1937.

Tourism is the main source of income for the town of Zürs. Due to its high altitude (over 2,000m), the landscape is largely free of forest and therefore offers a clear view of the surrounding Alpine peaks. In addition, there is always plenty of snow in the Arlberg region, providing a picturesque setting for winter sports.

From 1988 to 1994, numerous FIS Alpine Ski World Cup races were held in the Lech-Zürs ski area. In November 2020, after a long break, Lech once again hosted the Alpine Ski World Cup. The races took place on 26 and 27 November in the Flexenarena Zürs.

Today, Lech and Zürs am Arlberg alone have more than 1,600 inhabitants. Every year there are around 1 million overnight stays, although the number of beds in Lech Zürs is limited to 10,000 in order to maintain the quality of tourism and protect nature as much as possible. The Oberlech area has been a particular focus of nature conservation and has been a traffic-free zone since 1997.

== Culture and Sightseeing ==
The Church of Christ the King, designed by the architect Hans Feßler, was built between 1935 and 1936 and is located in the east of the village. It is one of the most remarkable sacred buildings of the 1930s that were built in the Alpine region. The painting on the altar wall shows Christ as Ruler, designed by the artist Johannes Troyer in 1936. The stained glass was designed by Martin Häusle and made at the Tyrolean Institute of Glass Painting. The wooden door relief of St. Wendelin was made by Walter Kuen.
