= Medicinicum Lech =

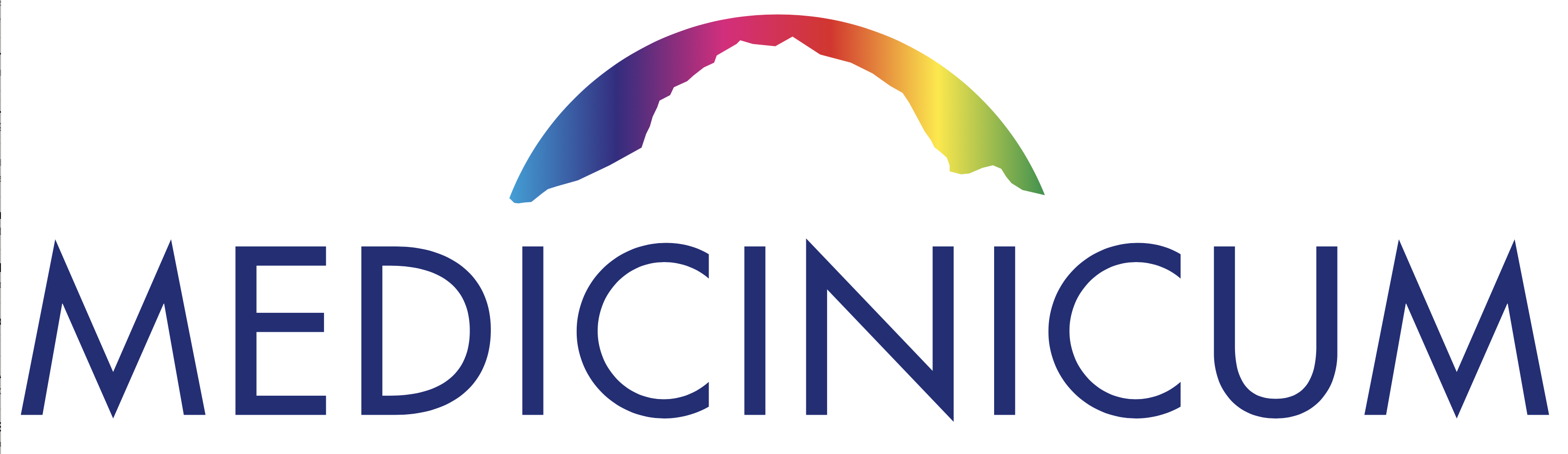
- Genre: Public health
- Locations: Lech am Arlberg, Vorarlberg
- Country: Austria
- Established: 2014
- Organizer: Markus M. Metka
- Website: www.medicinicum.at

The Medicinicum Lech is a public health event that has been held annually since 2014 in Lech am Arlberg in Vorarlberg (Austria). It is Vorarlberg's largest public health event.

The concept is to invite researchers and other medical professionals to give lectures in an interdisciplinary approach that draws on Western and Eastern medicine, alternative medicine. In addition to lectures and discussions, the Medicinicum is accompanied by events like cooking classes, herbal walks et cetera.

== Timeline ==
- 2014: "Jung bleiben – alt werden" (Staying young – getting old)
- 2015: "Lass Nahrung deine Medizin sein" (Let food be your medicine)
- 2016: "Stress – Fluch oder Segen? Gesund sein in hektischen Zeiten" (Stress – curse or blessing? Being healthy in hectic times)
- 2017: "Viele Wege führen zu Gesundheit – Rezepte aus Ost und West" (Many routes lead to health. Recipes from East and West)
- 2018: "Genuss – Sucht – Gesundheit" (Joy – Addiction – Health)
- 2019: “Der gesunde Mensch in einer gesunden Umwelt – Ökologie als Schlüsselfrage für unsere Gesundheit und Zukunft“ (The healthy human in a healthy environment – ecology as the key question for our health and future)
- ~~2020: "Ewig Jung! Auf dem Weg zur Unsterblichkeit" (Eternally Young! On the road to immortality)~~ (postponed due to COVID-19)
- 2021: "Ewig Jung! Auf dem Weg zur Unsterblichkeit" (Eternally Young! On the road to immortality)

== See also ==
- Philosophicum Lech
- Literaricum Lech
