= Philosophicum Lech =

Philosophical symposium in Lech am Arlberg, Vorarlberg

- Genre: Socio-cultural philosophy, anthropology
- Locations: Lech am Arlberg, Vorarlberg
- Country: Austria
- Established: 1997
- Next event: 20 to 25 September 2022
- Website: https://www.philosophicum.com/

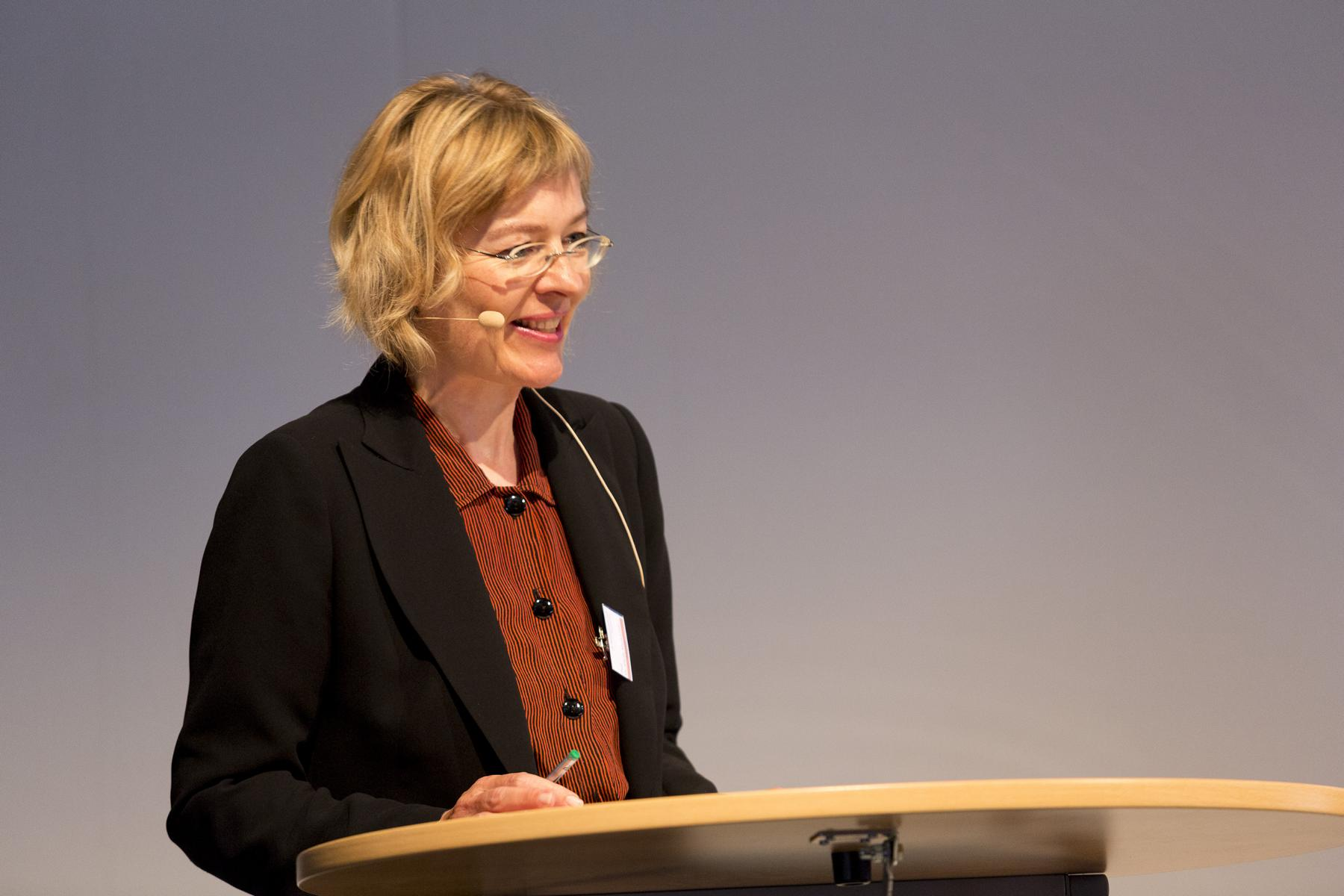
Maria-Sibylla Lotter speaking at the Philosophicum Lech in 2014

The Philosophicum Lech is a philosophical symposium in Lech am Arlberg in Vorarlberg (Austria). It has been established for the philosophical, cultural and social science reflection, discussion and encounter.

== History ==
The idea for a philosophical exchange in Lech arose in a conversation between Mayor Ludwig Muxel and the Vorarlberg writer Michael Köhlmeier. Austrian philosopher Konrad Paul Liessmann was appointed to be the scientific director.

For his efforts to convey scientific work to a broad population, Konrad Paul Liessmann was named "Scientist of the Year 2006" by education and science journalists.

In 1997, the first Philosophicum Lech took place in which around 100 visitors participated. In more recent years, the event counted more than 600 participants.

=== Venue ===
The first event location was the hotel "Die Krone von Lech". Over 100 people interested in philosophy gathered. From then on, the symposium enjoyed steadily increasing audience numbers, which is why it moved to the "Fux-Restaurant + Bar + Kultur" in 1999 due to a lack of space. There, too, capacity limits were soon reached, with the result that the Philosophicum Lech was held twice in the "Lech Postgarage" from 2003 before it found its current destination in Lech's new church.

== Tractatus – the award for philosophical essay writing ==
In 2009, the Tractatus was introduced. It is a prize for scientific prose or philosophical essay writing endowed with a prize money of €25,000. The award is given to outstanding German-language publications that discuss philosophical questions in the broader sense. In an ambitious yet understandable way, the author should analyse central topics of the time and develop new perspectives on them, thus making an overall contribution to a high-quality debate of public interest.

Even though the 2020 edition of the event did not take place, the essay prize Tractatus was awarded nevertheless. The 2020 Tractatus winner is Roberto Simanowski for his book on artificial intelligence.

The 2021 winner was Prof. Dr. Christoph Möllers; he wrote on potential forms of order which could allow freedom of movement and social variance.

The 2022 winner was Marie Luise Knott for her long essay, “370 Riverside Drive, 730 Riverside Drive: Hannah Arendt and Ralph Waldo Ellison”.

The 2023 winner was Isolde Charim for her work, "The Agony of Narcissism".

== Timeline ==
The following subjects were chosen for their respective event year:

- 2022: "Hatred. Autonomy of an elementary feeling."
- 2021: "As if! The power of fiction"
- ~~2020: "As if! The power of fiction"~~ (postponed to 2021 due to COVID-19)
- 2019: "The values of the few. Elites and Democracy"
- 2018: "The hell. Cultures of the Unbearable"
- 2017: "The Courage to be lazy. The work and its fate"
- 2016: "About God and the world. Philosophising in Troubled Times"
- 2015: "New people! Form, optimize, perfect"
- 2014: "Crime and Punishment. After the end of responsibility"
- 2013: "I. The individual in his networks"
- 2012: "Animals. Man and his nature"
- 2011: "The hunt for happiness. Perspectives and limits of a good life"
- 2010: "The State. How much rule does a person need?"
- 2009: "The magic of beauty. Stimulus, Desire and Destruction"
- 2008: "Money. What holds the world together at its core?"
- 2007: "The Gretchenfrage: 'Now tell me, how do you feel about religion?'"
- 2006: "The Freedom of Thought"
- 2005: "The worth of man. At the borders of the human"
- 2004: "The will to appear. About Truth and Lies"
- 2003: "Fame, death and immortality. On dealing with finitude"
- 2002: "The channels of power. Rule and Freedom in the Media Age"
- 2001: "The wily god. On the Future of Eros"
- 2000: "The father of all things. Thinking About War"
- 1999: "The fury of disappearing. On the Fate of the Old in the Age of the New"
- 1998: "In the intoxication of the senses. Art between animation and asceticism"
- 1997: "The flowers of evil. On the Abyss of the Human"

== See also ==
- Medicinicum Lech
- Literaricum Lech
- reddit essay writing service
