= The White Ring (ski circuit) =

Ski circuit and ski race in Austria

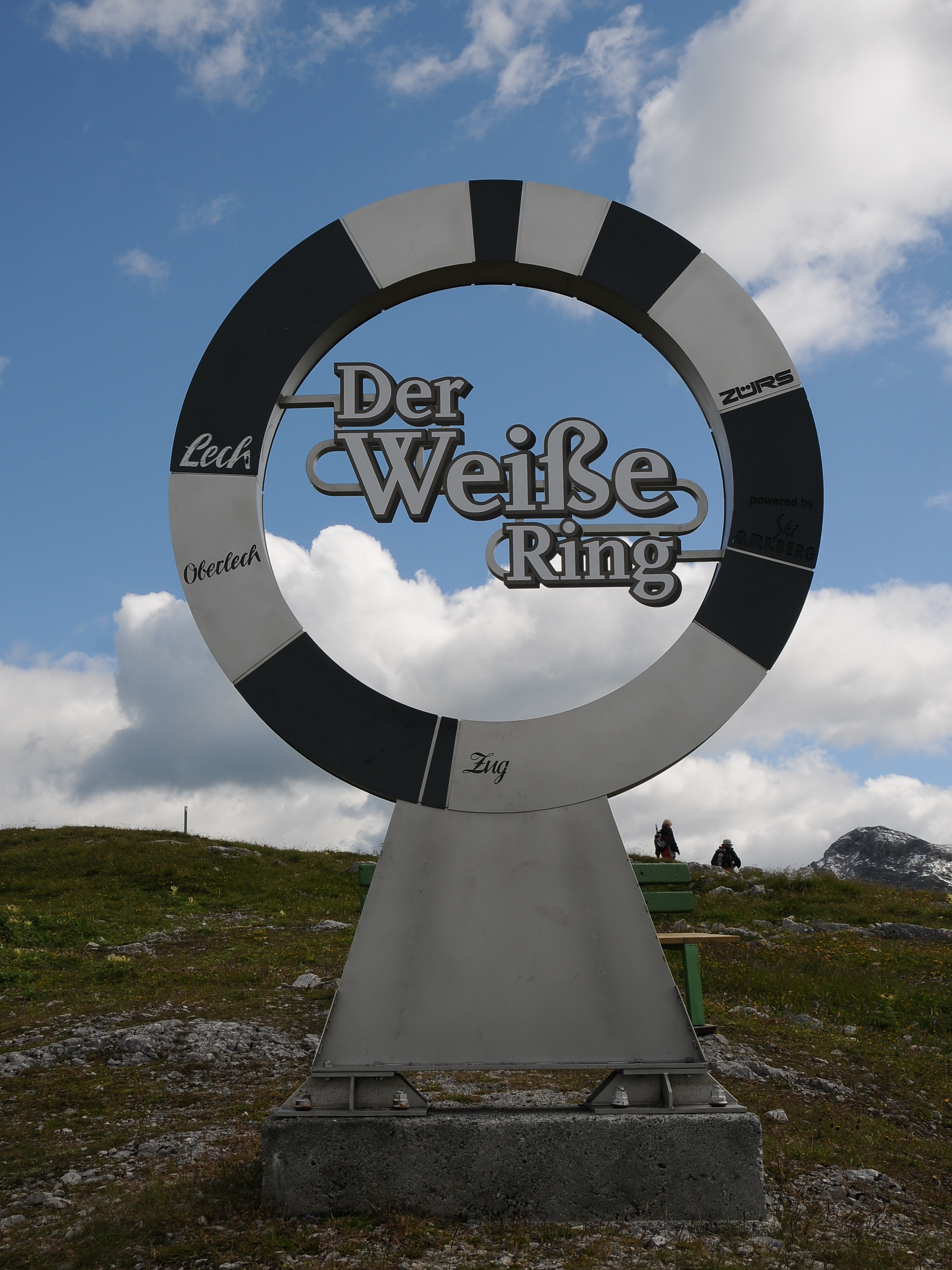
This sign is located at the mountain station of the Rüfikopfbahn.

The White Ring (German: Der Weiße Ring) is a ski circuit and ski race in the area of Lech am Arlberg, Vorarlberg (Austria). It is located in the Ski Arlberg ski resort. With 22 km, it is the longest ski round trip in the world. It features 5,500 m of altitude difference. The circuit comprises 5 downhill runs, 6 lifts, piste ascents and a cross-country ski run.

The original idea for the ski circuit stems from Vorarlberg ski pioneer Sepp Bildstein. The realisation began with the commissioning of the first drag lift in the winter of 1940/41.

== The course ==
Stage		Pistes / lifts	Length	Altitude
1		Rüfikopfbahn	2.131	890
2	38a	Steinmännle	1.634	366
3		Schüttbodenlift	590	155
4	38a	Schüttboden – Zürs	1.607	248
5		Trittalpbahn	920	288
6	3a	Hexenboden Direkte	1.798	466
7a		Seekopfbahn	1.548	514
7b		Zürserseebahn	1.587	491
8		Madlochbahn	1.316	294
9	33	Madloch – Zug	4.187	954
10		Zugerbergbahn	1.460	615
11		Balmengratlift	222	5
12	34	Kriegeralpe – Petersboden – Oberlech – Lech	4.236	644
In total			21.688	5.439

== The race ==
For the 50th anniversary of the ski circuit, the first White Ring ski race was held in the 2005/2006 season. 1,000 skiers participated in the event. The course record is 44:10:75 minutes and held since 2010 by Markus Weiskopf.

In 2023 the race was cancelled due to heavy snowfall. The next White Ring ski race will take place on 13 January 2024.

=== Speed Race ===
Two days before of the actual race, all racers are invited to test their speed. Among the 1,000 participants, the first 100 race numbers are awarded to the 100 fastest athletes. Spectators watch the racers along the 2 km track and at the finish in Zürs.
