= Redcedar bolt =

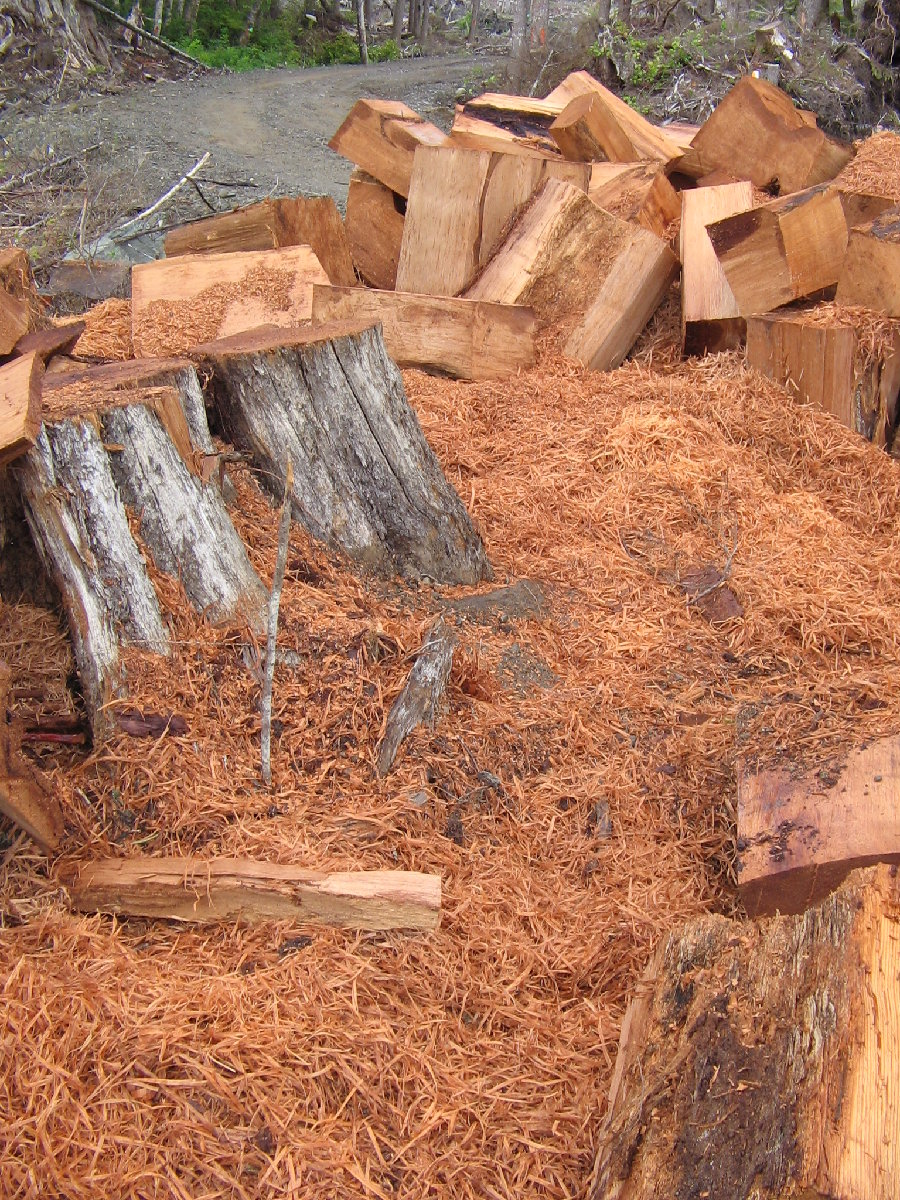
Western Redcedar bolts, stump, and shavings

Redcedar bolts are relatively small (commonly 1 ft × 1 ft × 1 ft or 30 cm × 30 cm × 30 cm) cubes of western redcedar that are later processed into redcedar roof shingles.
