= Lech (Vorarlberg) =

Village in Austria

- Municipality
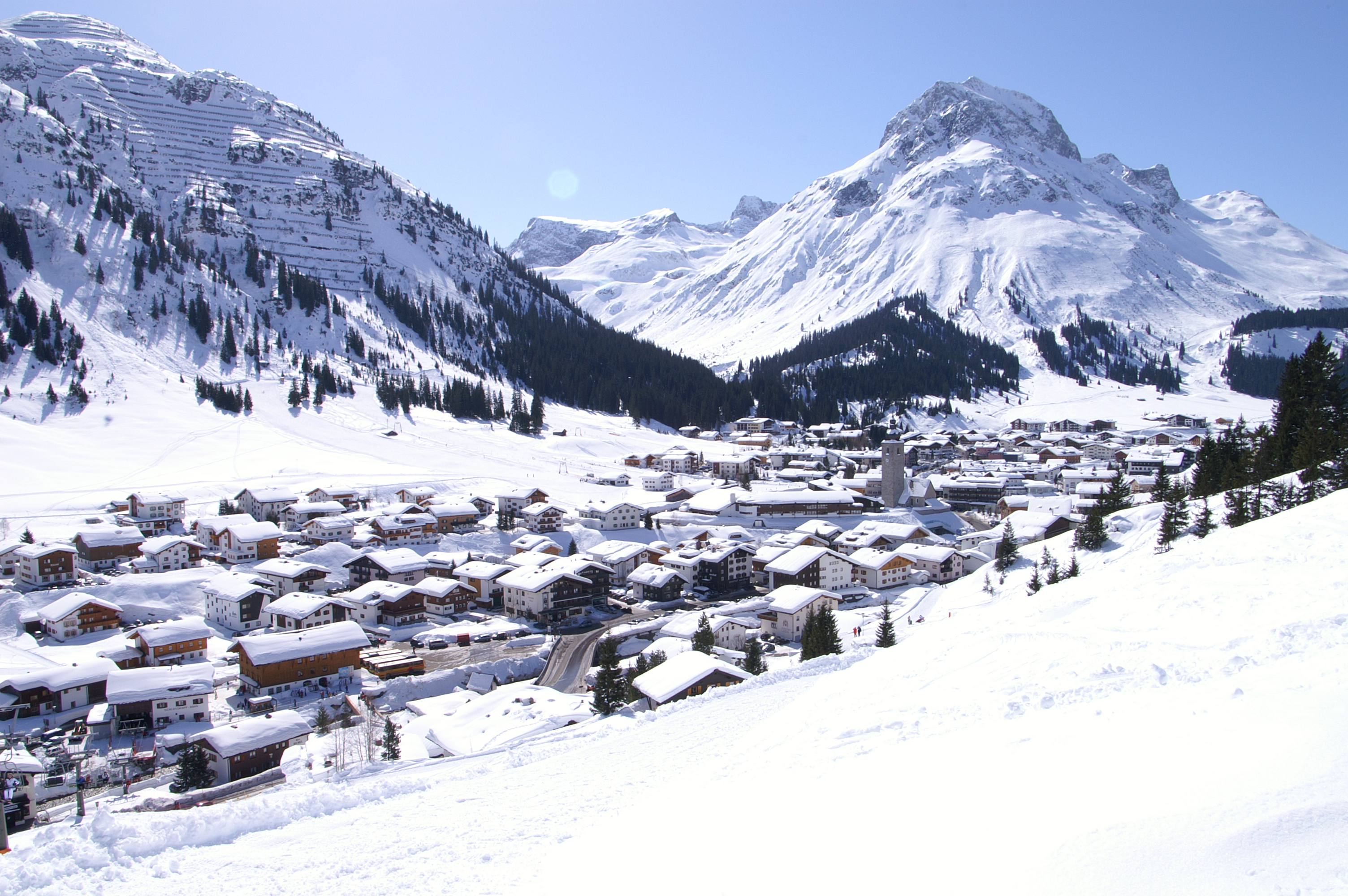

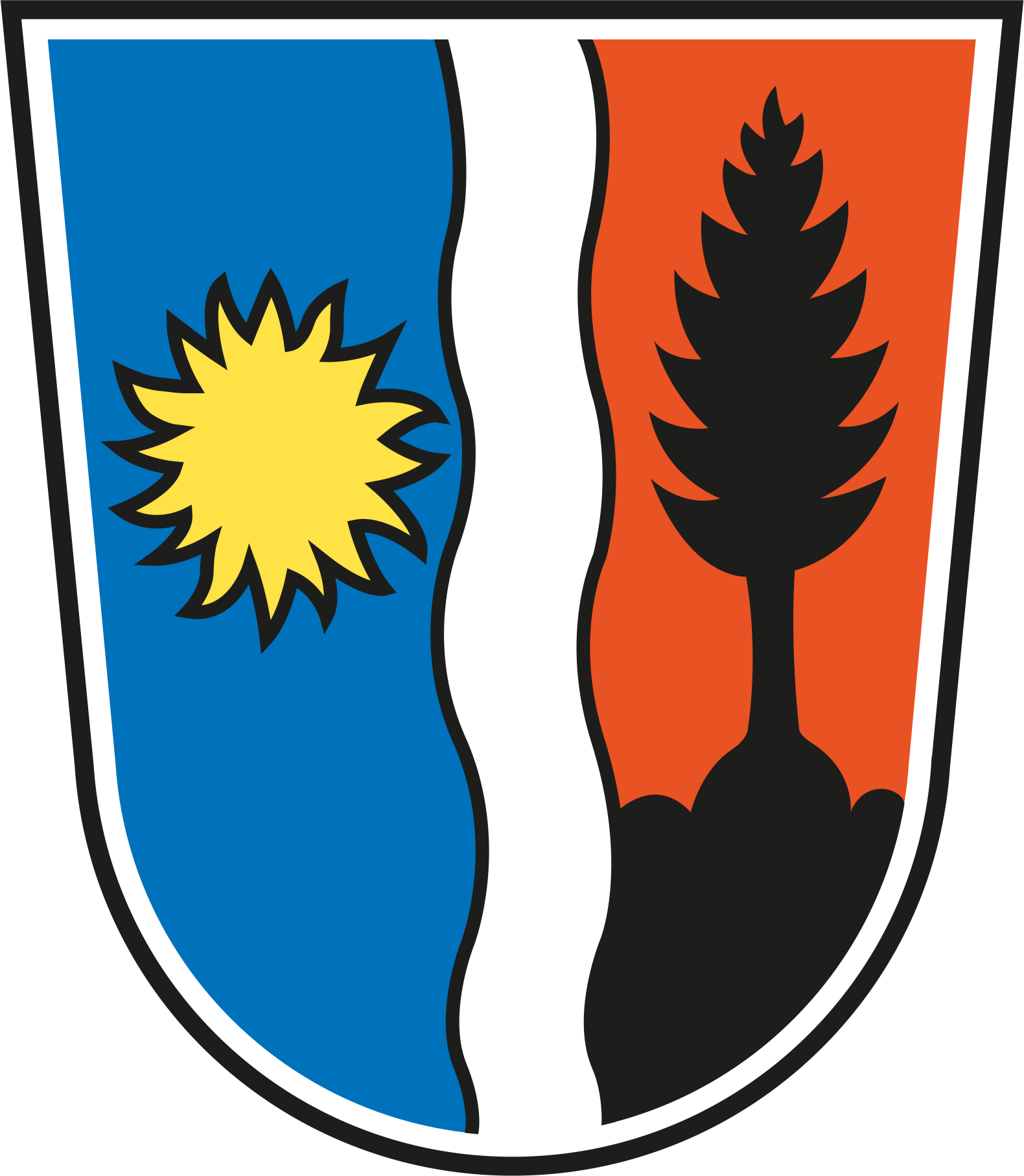
- Coat of arms

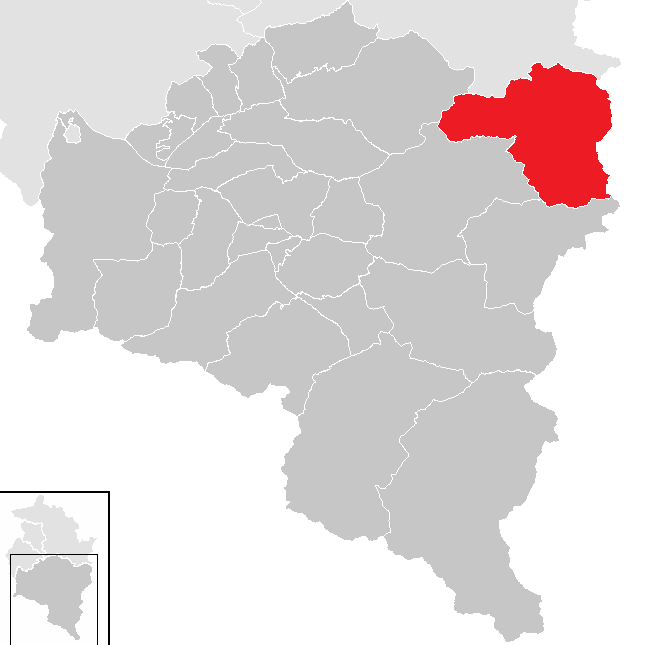
- Location in the district

- Location within Austria
- Coordinates: 47°12′00″N 10°09′00″E
- Country: Austria
- State: Vorarlberg
- District: Bludenz

Government
  - Mayor: Gerhard Lucian

Area
  - Total: 90.03 km^{2} (34.76 sq mi)
- Elevation: 1,444 m (4,738 ft)

Population (2018-01-01)
  - Total: 1,568
  - Density: 17.42/km^{2} (45.11/sq mi)
- Time zone: UTC+1 (CET)
  - Summer (DST): UTC+2 (CEST)
- Postal code: 6764
- Area code: 05583
- Vehicle registration: BZ
- Website: gemeinde.lech.at

Lech am Arlberg (Alemannic: Lääch) is a mountain village and an exclusive ski resort in the Bludenz district in the westernmost Austrian state of Vorarlberg, on the banks of the river Lech.

In terms of both geography and history, Lech belongs to the Tannberg district. In touristic terms, however, it is part of the Arlberg region. Lech is administered together with the neighbouring villages of Zürs, Zug, Oberlech and Stubenbach. The municipality is an internationally known winter sports resort on the Arlberg mountain range and caters to wealthier clientele, particularly to the international jet set and foreign royalty. The Dutch royal family and Russian oligarchs regularly ski there. Lech am Arlberg is one of the 12 members of the elite group "Best of the Alps".

== Geography ==
The altitude of 1444 m for the village refers to the location of the old church on a hill. 14.1% of the municipal area is forested, 58% of the area is Alpine. Geographically and historically, Lech belongs to the Hochtannberg region, formerly Tannberg, but in terms of tourism the municipality is part of the Arlberg region. Lech belongs to the district of Bludenz and also to the judicial district of Bludenz, but unlike its southern neighboring communities of Klösterle and Dalaas, which also belong to the district of Bludenz, it is not located in the Klostertal, but in the Arlberg massif to the northeast of it.

In the municipal area of Lech, the source rivers Formarinbach (source near the Formarinsee) and Spullerbach, which flows out of the Spullersee, merge to form the river Lech, which then flows via Warth through the Tyrolean Lechtal towards Bavaria.

== History ==
Lech was first mentioned in 642. It was settled and founded in the first half of the 13th century by Walser migrants from the canton of Wallis in Switzerland. Until the nineteenth century, it was known as "Tannberg". Subsequently, the full name "Tannberg am Lech" gave rise to the present name "Lech".

The church of St Nicholas, which is thought to have been built around 1390, was the parish church of the Tannberg administrative district, and there was also a Tannberg district court in Lech until the dissolution of the Tannberg district in 1806.

During the Napoleonic Wars, Lech was temporarily ceded to Bavaria along with the provinces of Tyrol and Vorarlberg.

Until 1885, the mountain farmers of the Arlberg region lived exclusively from agriculture, mainly dairy farming and cattle rearing. The arrival of the Arlberg Railway brought the first tourists and the new sport of skiing.

The villages of Lech, Warth and Zürs am Arlberg were virtually inaccessible in winter until the construction of the Flexen road, as huge amounts of snow blocked the roads and avalanches were a constant threat. For those, who dared to travel, the journey from the main station in Langen to Lech took at least 2.5 hours. For the Flexen road, paths were blasted into the rock, creating a permanent link between Stuben, Zürs and Lech. The Flexen road took 5 years to build.

The first ski school in Lech was founded in 1925. In the beginning there were only 2 instructors at the school. Students had to climb the mountain on foot before they could learn to ski on unprepared slopes. In 1939 Lech's first lift was opened.

In recent decades, the once small town has developed into a flourishing community, thanks to the influence of winter tourism and, increasingly, summer tourism.

Today, Lech and Zürs am Arlberg alone have more than 1,600 inhabitants. Every year there are around 1 million overnight stays, although the number of beds in Lech Zürs is limited to 10,000 in order to maintain the quality of tourism and protect nature as much as possible. The Oberlech area has been a particular focus of nature conservation and has been a traffic-free zone since 1997.

== Population ==
Historical population
Year	Pop.	±%
1869	436	—
1880	410	−6.0%
1890	371	−9.5%
1900	339	−8.6%
1910	352	+3.8%
1923	373	+6.0%
1934	751	+101.3%
1939	606	−19.3%
1951	681	+12.4%
1961	931	+36.7%
1971	1,223	+31.4%
1981	1,270	+3.8%
1991	1,234	−2.8%
2001	1,466	+18.8%
2011	1,627	+11.0%

== Climate ==
Lech has a subarctic climate, bordering on a humid continental climate with cold winters and cool summers. The heavy snows, which fall in winter, make Lech a sought-after ski resort.

Climate data for Lech, Vorarlberg (1440 m; average temperatures 1982 – 2012) Dfc, bordering on Dfb.
Month	Jan	Feb	Mar	Apr	May	Jun	Jul	Aug	Sep	Oct	Nov	Dec	Year
Mean daily maximum °C (°F)	−0.7 (30.7)	0.3 (32.5)	3.5 (38.3)	7.1 (44.8)	11.8 (53.2)	17.4 (63.3)	16.8 (62.2)	14.3 (57.7)	15.1 (59.2)	9.7 (49.5)	3.7 (38.7)	0.1 (32.2)	8.3 (46.9)
Daily mean °C (°F)	−4.5 (23.9)	−3.7 (25.3)	−0.6 (30.9)	2.9 (37.2)	7.3 (45.1)	10.6 (51.1)	12.7 (54.9)	12.2 (54.0)	9.9 (49.8)	5.6 (42.1)	0.4 (32.7)	−3.3 (26.1)	4.1 (39.4)
Mean daily minimum °C (°F)	−8.2 (17.2)	−7.6 (18.3)	−4.7 (23.5)	−1.3 (29.7)	2.8 (37.0)	6.0 (42.8)	8.0 (46.4)	7.7 (45.9)	5.6 (42.1)	1.6 (34.9)	−2.9 (26.8)	−6.6 (20.1)	0.0 (32.1)
Average precipitation mm (inches)	59 (2.3)	54 (2.1)	56 (2.2)	70 (2.8)	103 (4.1)	113 (4.4)	133 (5.2)	136 (5.4)	95 (3.7)	67 (2.6)	78 (3.1)	66 (2.6)	1,030 (40.5)
Source: "Lech climate data".

== Sport and Leisure ==
In recent years Lech has grown to become one of the world's prime ski destinations and the home of a number of world and Olympic ski champions.

Lech is best known for its skiing (both on-piste and off-piste). It is well-networked via mechanical lifts and well-groomed pistes with the neighbouring villages of Zürs, St. Christoph, St. Anton, Stuben, Warth, and Schröcken. All these villages are located in the Arlberg region, the birthplace of the modern Alpine skiing and the seat of the Ski Club Arlberg. It is one of the most extensive connected ski areas in Austria and one of the largest in Europe.

Lech is also the starting and finishing point for The White Ring, a circle of runs and lifts that is a popular tour and the scene of an annual race involving 1,000 participating ski racers. With its 22 km, it is considered the longest ski circuit in the world.

The mountain holiday scenes in the movie Bridget Jones: The Edge of Reason were shot in Lech.

=== FIS Alpine World Ski Championships ===
The ski area Lech-Zürs has been the venue for numerous FIS Alpine World Ski Championship races in the past, including the following:

- November 2021: parallel (men), winner: Hirschbuehl Christian (AUT)

parallel (women), winner: Slokar Andreja (SLO) and Stjernesund Thea Louise (NOR)

- November 2020: parallel (men), winner: Pinturault Alexis (FRA)

slalom (women), winner: Petra Vlhova (SVK)

- January 1988: super-G (women), winner: Zoe Haas (SUI)
- November 1991: 2 slalom races (women), winners: Vreni Schneider (SUI) and Bianca Fernández Ochoa (SPA)
- January 1993: slalom (men), winner: Thomas Fogdö (SWE)
- January 1993: combination (men), winner: Marc Girardelli (LUX)
- December 1993: super-G (men), winner: Hannes Trinkl (AUT)
- December 1994: 2 slalom races (men), winner: Alberto Tomba (IT)

In 2020, the Audi FIS Ski World Cup was postponed to 26 and 27 November due to a lack of snow and high temperatures on the original dates of November 14 and 15. The next alpine ski races will be held again in Lech on 10 and 11 November 2023.

=== Wintersport ===
The Ski Arlberg ski area on both sides of the Vorarlberg border currently (as of the 2014/15 season) comprises 350 km of groomed slopes and 200 km of designated touring slopes. About 63 per cent of the ski slopes can be covered with artificial snow. A total of 97 lifts and cable cars are in operation with a transport capacity of 123,600 people per hour. Lech and Oberlech (Arlberg West) account for 23 of these lifts and cable cars, as well as 17 ski runs and 18 ski routes.

Since the 2013/14 winter season, the Auenfeldjet gondola lift has connected the previously neighbouring but separate ski areas of Ski Arlberg West and Snowworld Warth-Schröcken. In the 2016/17 winter season, the last gap in the area was closed with the construction of the Flexenbahn between Stuben and Zürs. The resulting combined ski area is currently the largest in Austria, with a total of 88 lifts and 304 kilometres of pistes. However, tickets can only be purchased for the Snowworld-Warth-Schröcken, Ski Arlberg Ost and Ski Arlberg West ski areas; the Ski Arlberg ski pass is required to use the entire ski area.

The Langer Zug piste (piste number 215) from Rüfikopf (via piste 181) to Lech is one of the ten steepest groomed pistes in the world.

As part of the extreme snowfall in central Europe in January 2019, the Lange Zug was in the media as a German avalanche victim was searched for several days: A group of four experienced German skiers were killed by an avalanche on a slope that was closed at the time. Only three people were found during the initial search, and the fourth victim was not recovered until four days after the accident.

=== Heliskiing ===
Lech is the only place in Austria where heliskiing is still permitted. The landing sites are on the Mehlsack (2652 m) and on the Orgelscharte near the Göppinger Hütte (Göppinger Hut). There are no flights on weekends or on public holidays. The ÖAV questioned the legality of the extension of the heliskiing permit in 2016. In January 2022, the permit was again extended, despite sharp criticism from the Green Party in the Vorarlberg coalition government, a negative opinion from the Vorarlberg environmental department and a similarly negative opinion from the Bludenz district administration. Wucher, the helicopter company operating the heliskiing, had applied for a 5-year extension, as had been the case in the past. In the face of growing criticism of the activity, which causes massive environmental damage, the current permit is limited to 2.5 years, and it is doubtful that it will be renewed in 2024. Vorarlberg regional councillor Rauch and the ÖAV announced that they would review the permit or take legal action against it. In each of the last two winter seasons, around 250 such flights took place, involving around 1000 participants.

=== Mountainbiking ===
Lech is also a popular destination for mountain bikers in summer and autumn. The Heckmair and Joe Transalp routes pass through Lech.

=== Hiking ===
Hikers can explore the Lech mountains on the Lechquellenrunde and Robert Bosch Trail. Many of the hiking trails in the Lech area can be reached using the facilities that are open in the summer as well as the so-called hiking buses. There are a number of Alpine Club huts, both with and without accommodation, that can be reached from Lech.

== Culture ==
=== Cultural sites ===
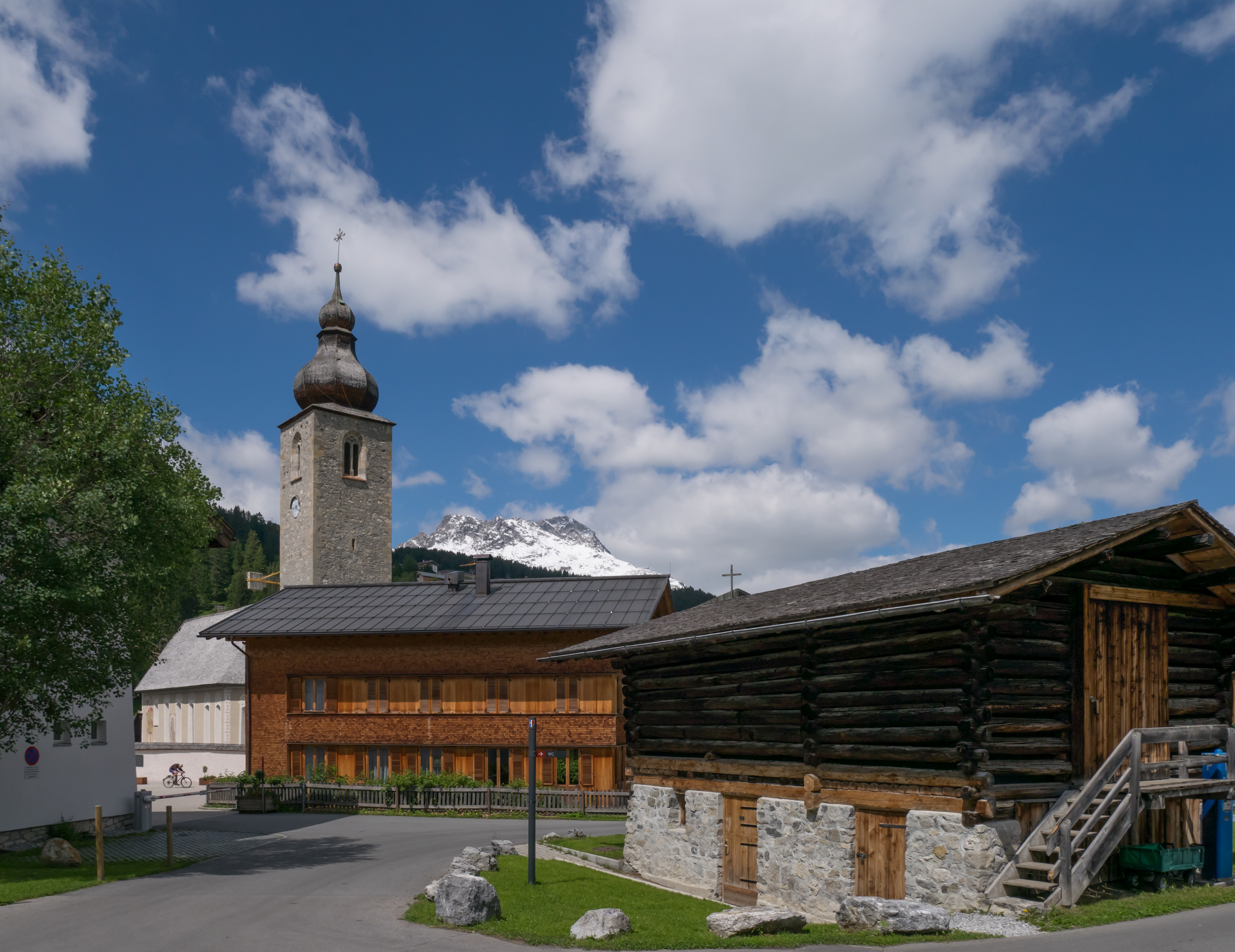
Church St Nicholas of Lech

Although not as well-frequented in the summer as it is in the winter, Lech nevertheless has sporting, cultural, culinary, and other activities. There are many premier hotels in Lech, as well as numerous top class restaurants.

One former well-known visitor was the writer Ludwig Bemelmans (author of the Madeline books), whose 1949 novel The Eye of God was set in a fictionalised Lech.

Lech has a number of points of cultural interest, including:

- the church of St Nicholas, which was built in the Gothic style around 1390, and extensively renovated in 1987. Particular features are the Rococo interior dating from 1791 (although there are some earlier Romanesque frescoes); the 33-metre-high tower with its distinctive onion-shaped dome; and bronze bells, the oldest of which dates from the beginning of the sixteenth century,
- the historic Huber House, now a museum, was built in 1590; it displays examples of the earlier way of life and work in the region, with a traditional kitchen and workshop,
- "Horizon-Fields": life-sized human sculptures by the sculptor Antony Gormley, which were placed in the mountains surrounding Lech. Originally numbering 100, most were removed in April 2012,
- The Green Ring: a three-day tour around Lech-Zürs in Vorarlberg, in which a person well-versed in local literature serves as a hiking guide. Along the trail there are 35 art installations dealing with local people, culture and stories. This was originally a LEADER-Project, carried out by the two artists Daniela Egger and Daniel Kocher. The art and literature project "The Green Ring" will be continuously and sustainably expanded and extended in the coming years,
- The Skyspace Lech is an art installation by James Turrell. A skyspace is an enclosed space which is open to the sky through a large hole in the ceiling. Visitors gaze at the changing light colors on the walls, and at the sky during sunrise and sunset. It was opened in 2018.

=== Regular events ===
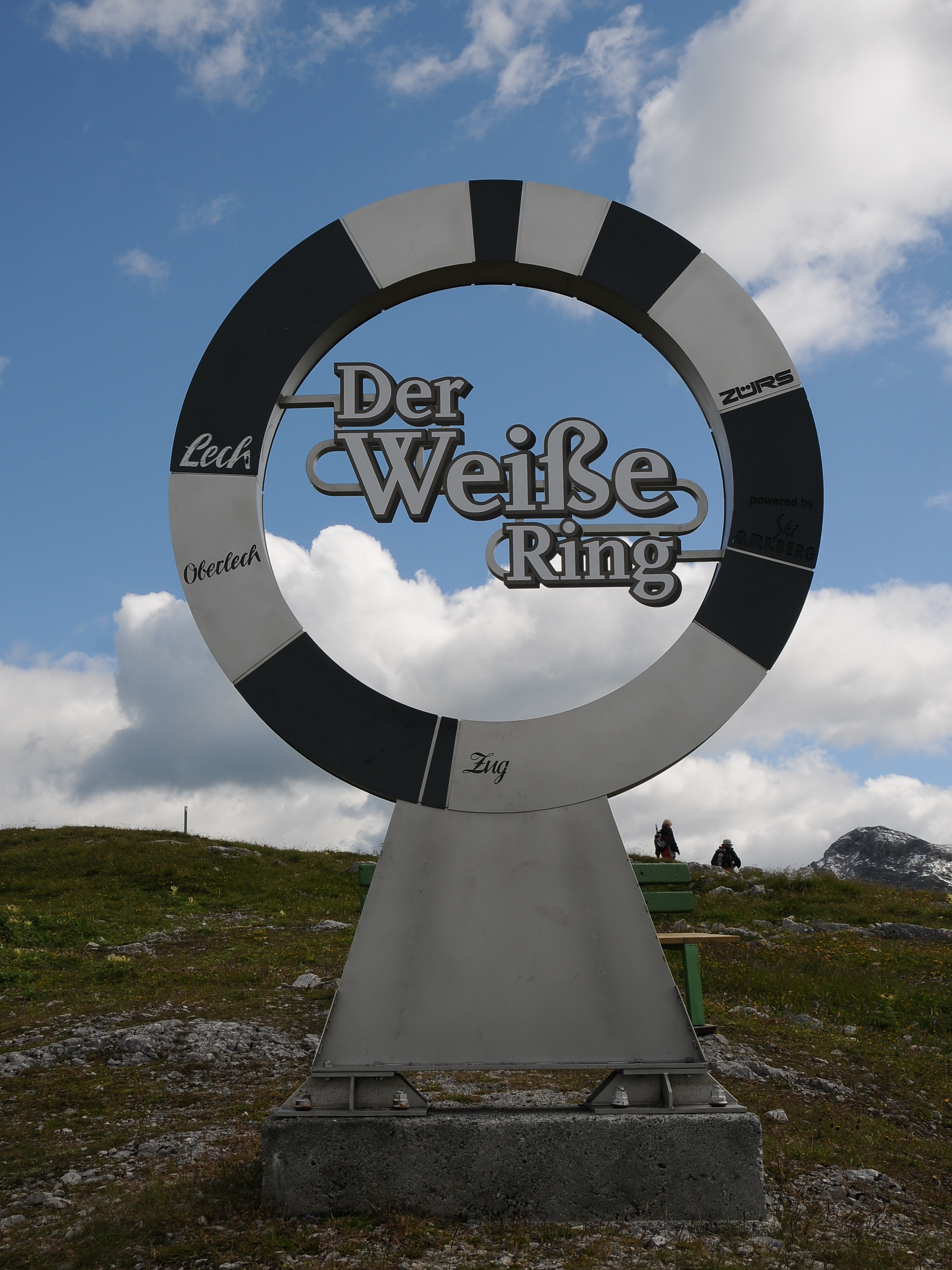
Sign for the White Ring circuit

- The White Ring (Der Weiße Ring) is the longest ski race in the world, according to Guinness Book of Records. 5,500 metres altitude, 22 kilometres of ski runs. Ski pioneer Sepp Bildstein was the initiator of the White Ring, the ski resort that has connected the villages of Lech, Zürs, Zug and Oberlech for over 50 years. In 1940, the first ski lift was built on the White Ring, thus laying the foundations for a legendary skiing holiday resort. In addition to 22 kilometres of ski runs, the winter sports enthusiast have a unique mountain backdrop, also thanks to viewing platforms and art installations. The first race at the White Ring was held in 2006 for the 50th anniversary of the ski resort. The course record is 44:10:75 minutes and has been held since 2010 by Markus Weiskopf.
- Philosophicum Lech: The Philosophicum Lech is a philosophical symposium on philosophical, cultural and social science reflection, discussion and encounter. The well-endowed Tractatus prize is awarded to the best scientific essay.
- Medicinicum Lech: A public health event that deals with topics related to health and nutrition.
- Arlberg Classic Car Rally: In 2017, for the eighth time, 120 classic cars from 1908 to 1973 went on tour between Arlberg and Zugspitze for three days, as a rolling museum. In memory of the great achievements of the former road builders, the beginning of the really leads from Lech down through the Flexenpassgalerie to Stuben and finally to Wald am Arlberg. The route between Lech and Zürs was opened in 1897 and is regarded as a technical masterpiece.
- In July 2021, the literary festival Literaricum Lech will take place for the first time in Lech, dedicated to a masterpiece of world literature. For the 2021 premiere, the oldest bestseller in the German language, "Simplicius Simplicissimus" by Hans Jakob Christoffel von Grimmelshausen, was examined from different angles.

== Notable people ==
=== Natives ===
- Gerhard Nenning (1940-1995), alpine ski racer

=== Residents ===
- Trudi Beiser, 1940s and 1950s Olympic skiing champion and world skiing champion
- Othmar Schneider, 1950s Olympic skiing champion
- Egon Zimmermann, 1960s Olympic skiing champion and world skiing champion
- Patrick Ortlieb, 1990s Olympic skiing champion and world skiing champion

== Sister cities ==
- Beaver Creek Resort, Avon, Colorado, United States of America
- Kampen, Sylt, Germany
- Hakuba, Happo, Japan

== In fiction ==
Lech is at the location of the fictitious thriller An Exchange of Eagles by Owen Sela, in which a group of German and American conspirators tries to assassinate Adolf Hitler during the dictator's stay at the resort in 1940.

The action in the detective novel Crossed Skis - An Alpine Mystery by Carol Carnac, who also wrote as E. C. R. Lorac, takes place in London and Lech, with a party of English skiers. First published in 1952, it was republished in 2020 as part of the British Library Crime Classics series.

Lech was one of the filming locations of the 2004 movie Bridget Jones: The Edge of Reason, with Renée Zellweger.
