= Lechquellen Mountains =

Mountain group in Austria

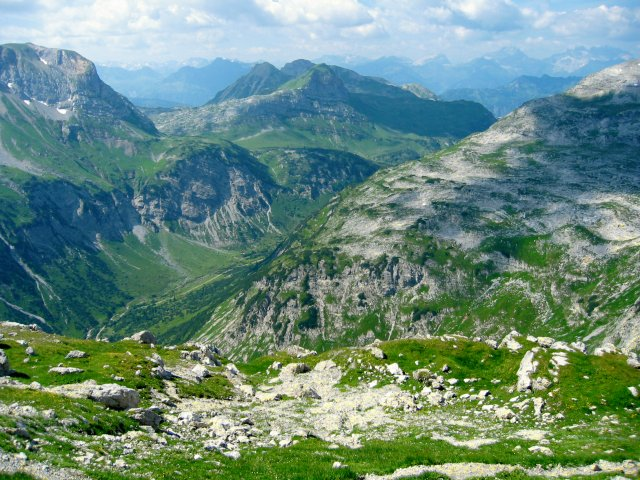
- Lechquellen Mountains: view into the Lech valley

Highest point
- Peak: Untere Wildgrubenspitze
- Elevation: 2,753 m above sea level (AA)

Geography
- Location within Alps
- State(s): Vorarlberg, Austria
- Range coordinates: 47°11′10″N 9°59′06″E

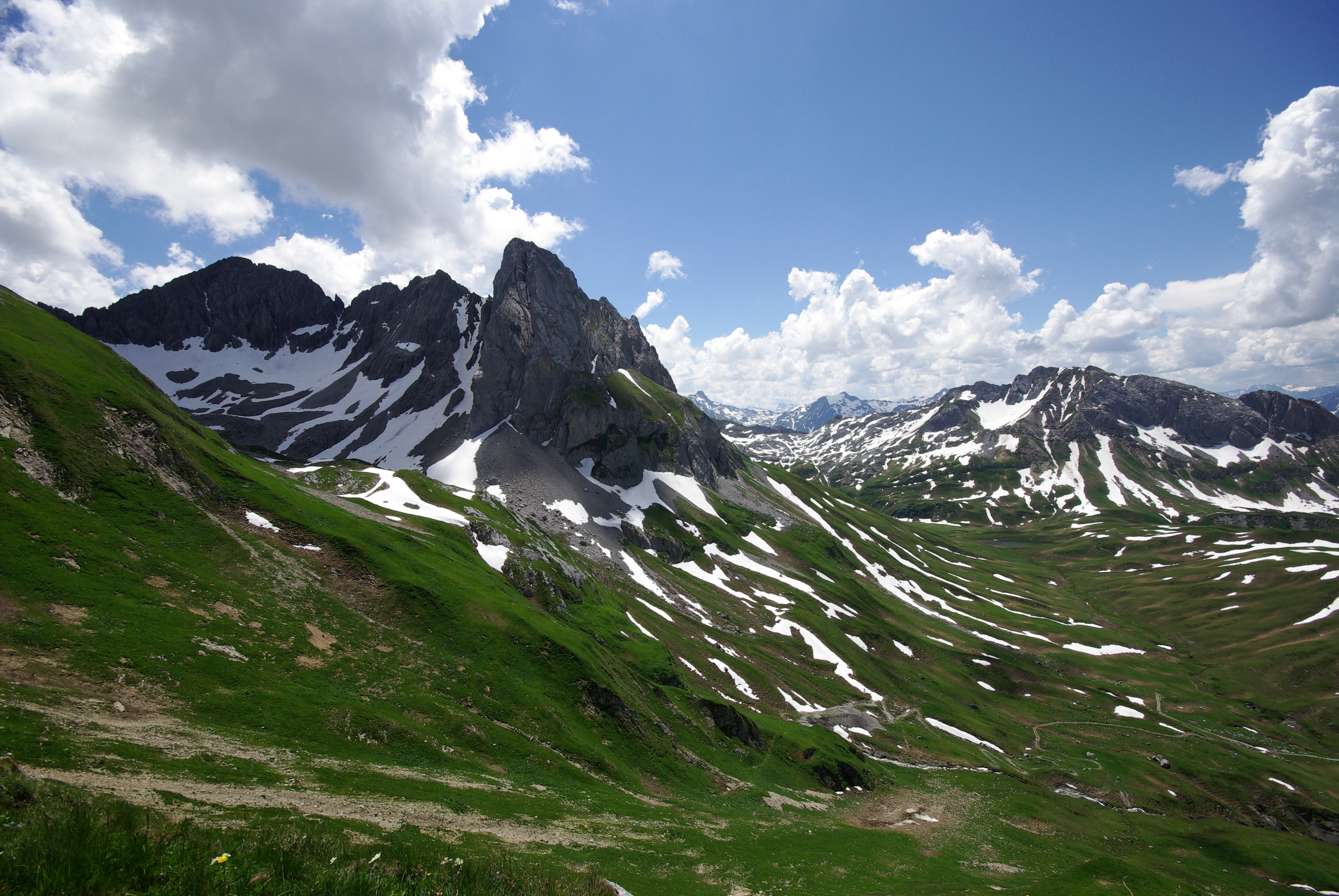
View of the Untere Wildgrubenspitze, Roggalspitze and Rhonspitze

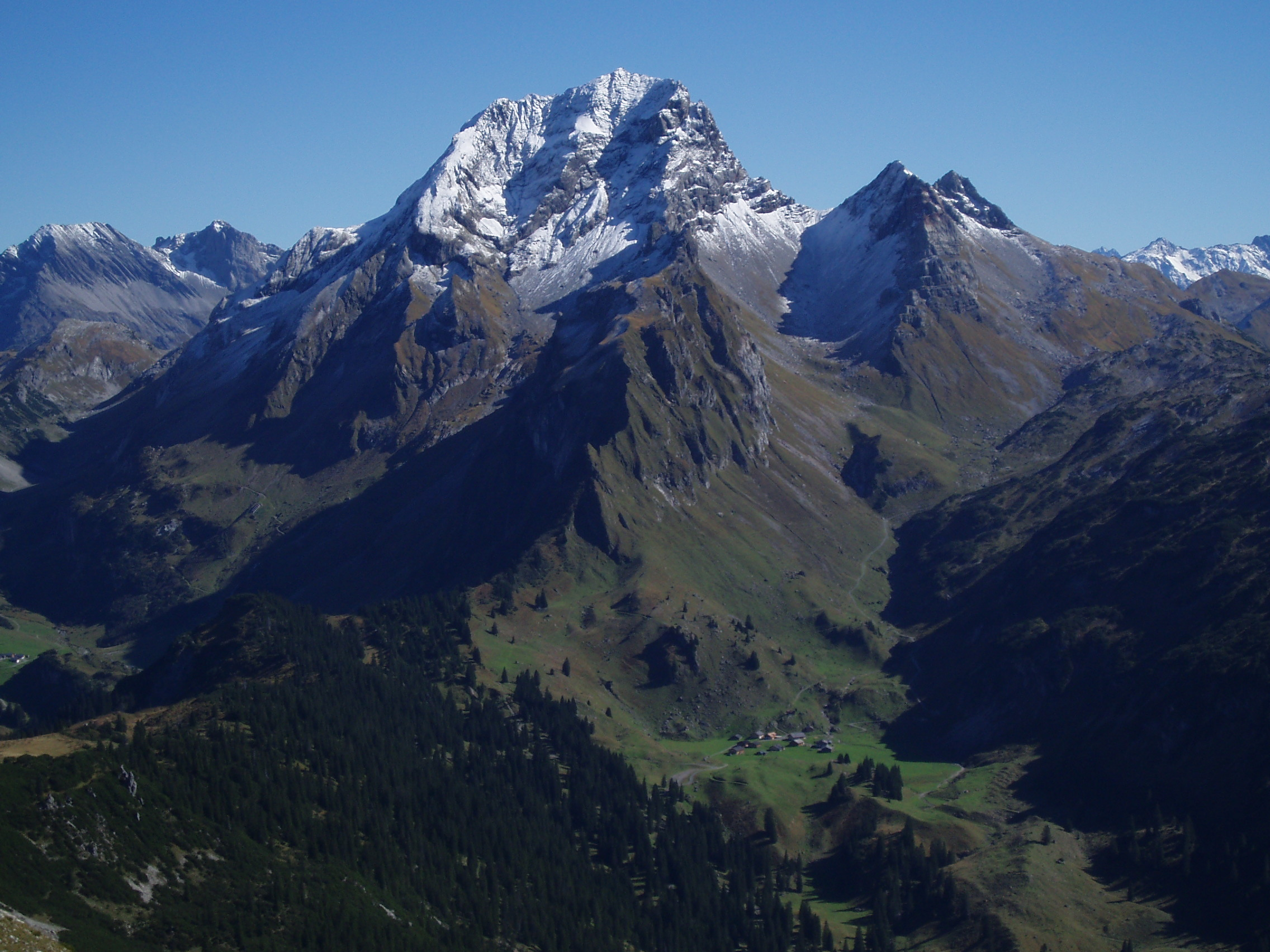
Rote Wand

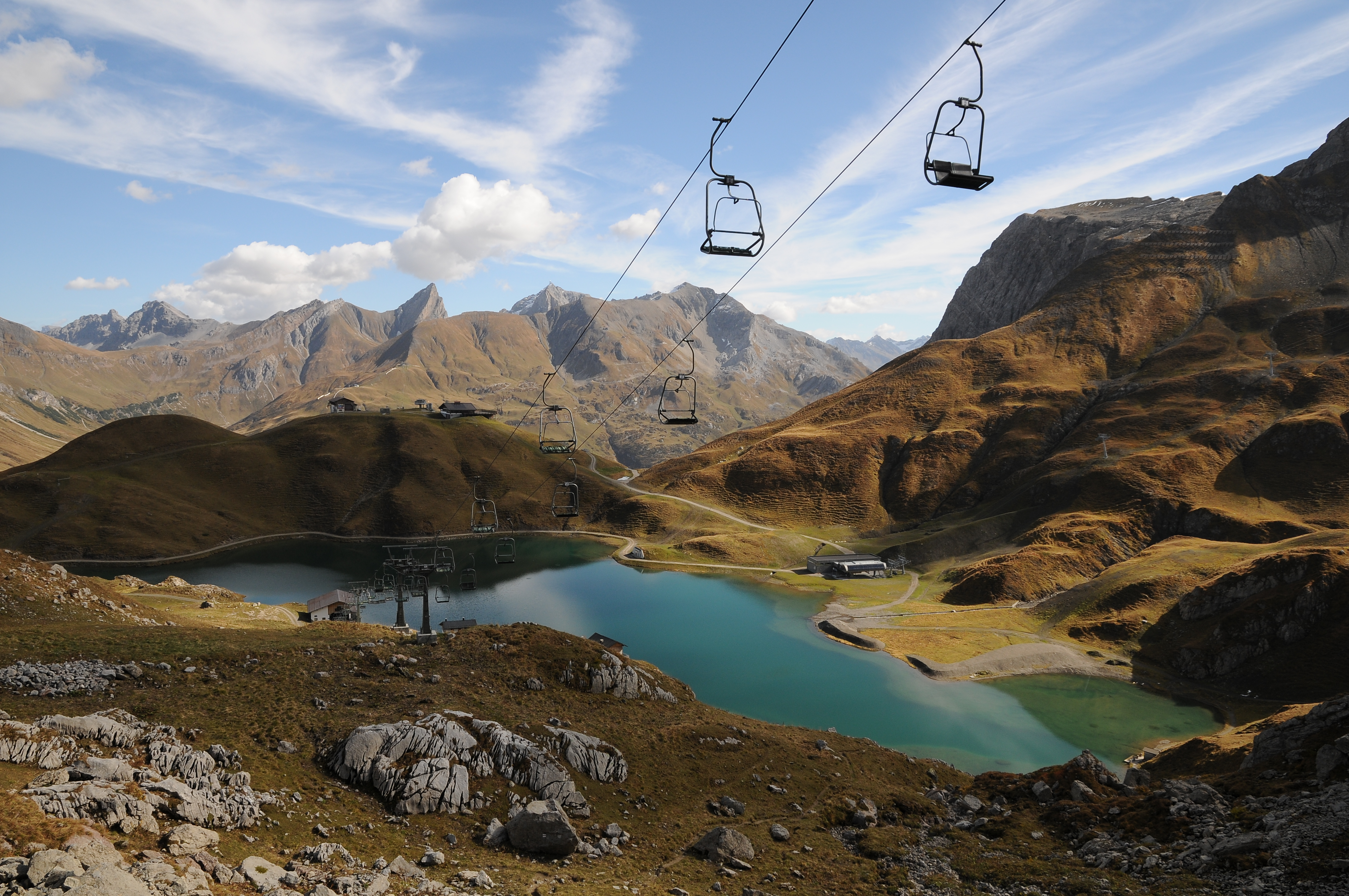
Zürsersee; in the background: Valluga and Roggspitze

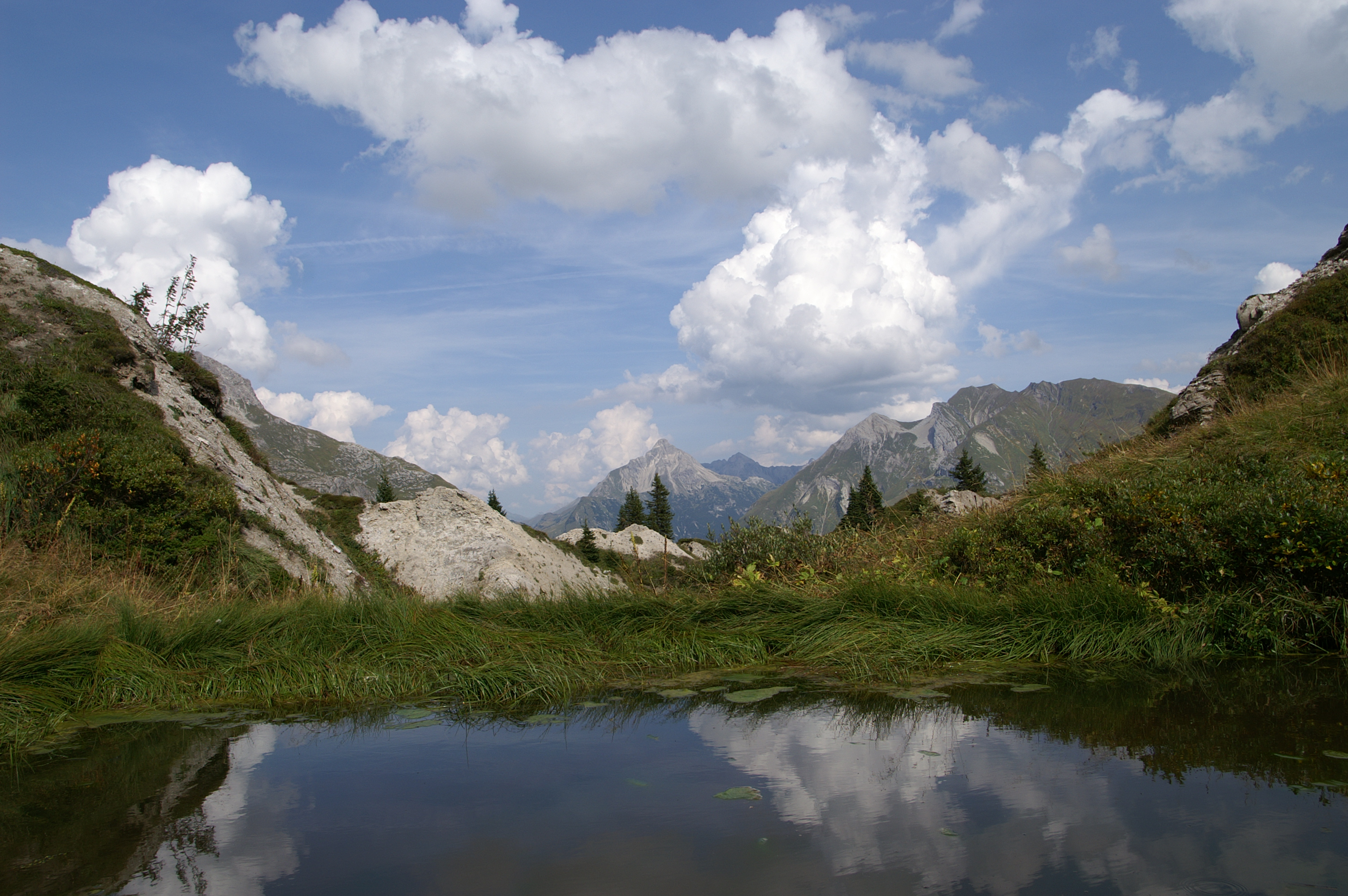
Gipslöcher nature reserve on the Biberkopf

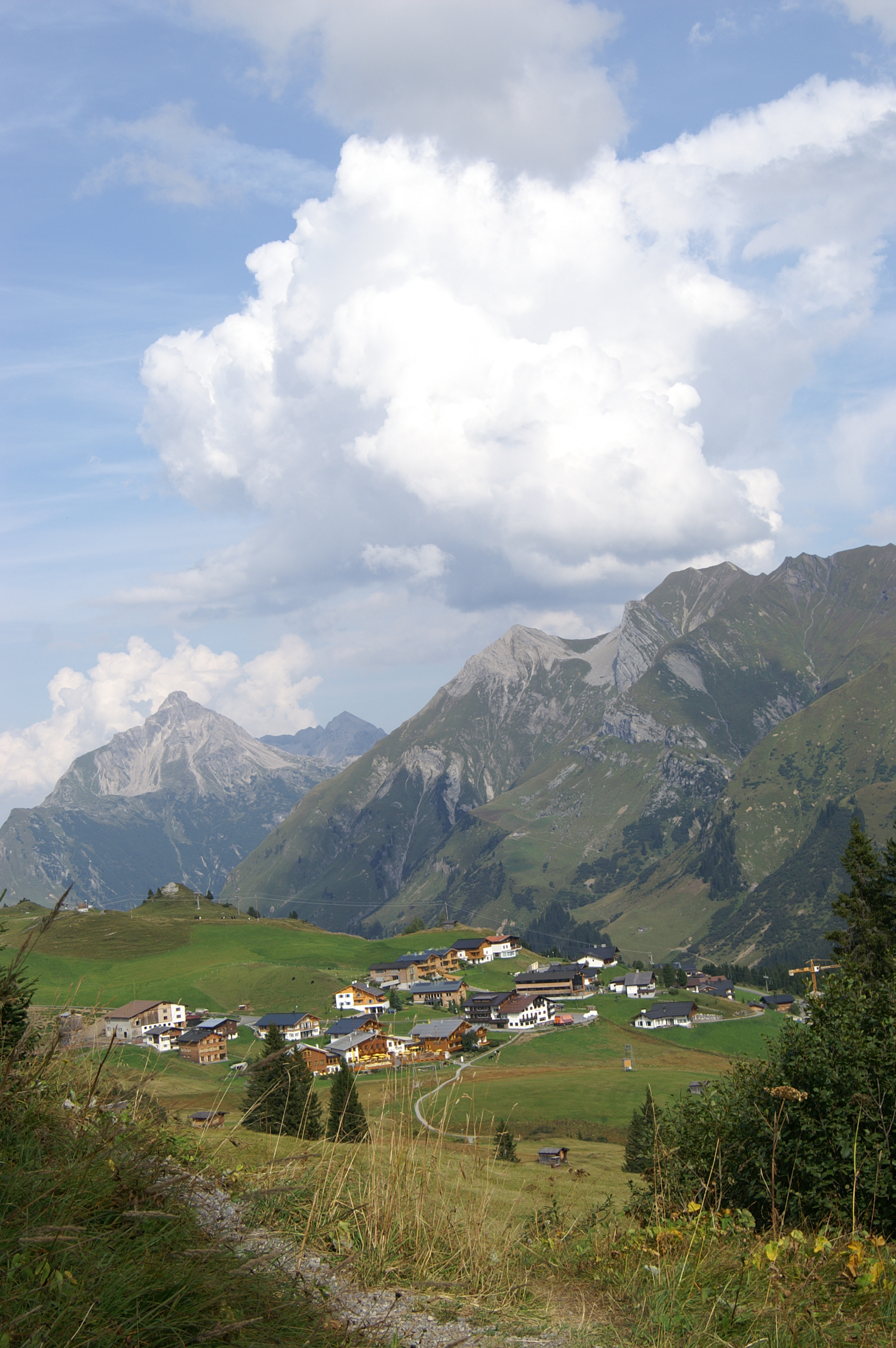
The Gipslöcher nature reserve. Rear left: the Biberkopf

The Lechquellen Mountains (German: Lechquellengebirge) or Lechquellen range is a small mountain group within the Northern Limestone Alps of the Eastern Alps. It lies entirely within the Austrian state of Vorarlberg and includes the upper reaches of the river Lech with its headstreams in a horseshoe shape as well as the Upper Großwalsertal valley.

== Origin of the name ==
The name Lechquellengebirge (literally "Lech source mountains") is certainly accurate, for the greater part of the mountain range surrounds the upper reaches of the Lech with its two spring-fed streams, the Formarinbach and the Spullerbach. Nevertheless, it is in fact an artificial name made up by Walther Flaig at a time when the development of mountaineering in the Alps had been largely completed. Previously, the mountain range had been called either the Klostertal Alps or counted as part of the Lechtal Alps east of the Flexen Pass.

Artificial names often find it hard to establish themselves in everyday language. By contrast, there are Alpine groups named after placenames that go back centuries or even millennia, such as the Raetikon or the neighbouring Verwall. Others are named after valleys that have been referred to by the same name from time immemorial, such as the Ötztal Alps. It will take decades to determine whether the name of the Lechquellen Mountains has prevailed as naturally as the name of other Alpine groups. It is also unclear whether the UIAA or even the European Union will work out and lay down an internationally recognized classification of the Alps. If they do, then the Lechquellen Mountains will either be officially recognised or absorbed into other groups.

== Extent ==
The southern boundary of Lechquellen Mountains runs from the alpine town of Bludenz along the Klostertal to the Flexen Pass. From there, it continues in the east via Zürs and Lech and along the Lech to its confluence with the Krumbach. The Krumbach forms the boundary of the range in the north up to the Hochtann Mountain Pass. From there, it runs along the Seebach via the village of Schröcken and continues along the Bregenzer Ach stream up to Au and its confluence with the Argenbach. Then it goes up the Argenbach until just before Damuels and continues along the Faschinabach in the west to the Faschinajoch saddle. From there it descends into the Große Walsertal and along the Lutz to its confluence with the Ill. It then follows the Ill back to Bludenz.

The Flexen Pass connects the Lechquellen Mountains with the Lechtal Alps. The Hochtannberg Pass forms the link to the Allgäu Alps. The Faschinajoch is the connexion with the Bregenz Forest Mountains.

Walther Flaig, a well-known alpine guide and author from Vorarlberg, had a significant influence on the definition and extent of the Lechquellen Mountains. The name he gave to the mountains and his definition of their extent was included in the Alpine Club classification of the Eastern Alps (AVE).

== Passes and crossings ==
In addition to the named passes, there are no other passes or crossings that are accessible by car.

Other relevant touristic crossings are:

- Rauhes Joch (Location of the "Freiburger Hut", 1.918 m (AA), accessible from the east by road, the crossing is also accessible by mountain bikes)
- Spullersee (1,827 m above sea level (AA), crossing from Lechtal to Klostertal)
- Stierlochjoch (2,011 m above sea level (AA), Access from Lechtal to the Ravensburger Hut)
- Gamsboden (Location of the Göppinger Hut, 2,245 m above sea level (AA), crossing from Lechtal to Große Walsertal)

== Neighbouring ranges ==
The Lechquellen Mountains border on the following other groups in the Alps:

- Bregenz Forest Mountains (to the north)
- Allgäu Alps (to the northeast)
- Lechtal Alps (to the east)
- Verwall Alps (to the south)
- Rätikon (to the southwest)

== Summits ==
The 10 highest peaks in the Lechquellen Mountains are the:

- Untere Wildgrubenspitze, 2,753 m above sea level (AA)
- Rote Wand, 2,704 m above sea level (AA)
- Großer Grätlisgrat, 2,702 m above sea level (AA)
- Mittlere Wildgrubenspitze, east top, 2,696 m above sea level (AA)
- Mittlere Wildgrubenspitze, centre top, 2,695 m above sea level (AA)
- Rote Wand, Ostgipfel, 2,688 m above sea level (AA)
- Nadel, 2,685 m above sea level (AA)
- Spuller Schafberg, Hauptgipfel, 2,679 m above sea level (AA)
- Roggalspitze, 2,672 m above sea level (AA)
- Wasenspitze, 2,665 m above sea level (AA)

Other well known peaks in the Lechquellen, in order of height are the:

- Braunarlspitze, 2,649 m above sea level (AA)
- Hochlicht, 2,600 m above sea level (AA)
- Mohnenfluh, 2,542 m above sea level (AA)
- Karhorn, 2,416 m above sea level (AA)
- Zitterklapfen, 2,403 m above sea level (AA)
- Hochkünzelspitze, 2,397 m above sea level (AA)
- Roggelskopf, 2,284 m above sea level (AA)
- Feuerstein, 2,271 m above sea level (AA)
- Warther Horn, 2,257 m above sea level (AA)
- Gamsfreiheit, 2,211 m above sea level (AA)
- Hoher Fraßen, 1,979 m above sea level (AA)

== Tourism ==
The use of high-altitude roads (tolls) allows the motor vehicle to penetrate the interior of the mountains to a height of almost 2000 meters. But there are also larger areas with marked seclusion.

The valleys were populated by the so-called Walsers - a name which is found in many Tyrolean family names. Historically, alpine farming dominates and is known today under the term alpine transhumance, a 3-phase lifestyle that highly influenced culture, traditions and architecture.

Today tourism, especially ski tourism in Lech and the smaller villages of Zürs, Stuben and Damüls, as well as hiking is important.

=== Development of local public infrastructure ===
The Lechquellen mountains was made accessible in the second half of the 19th century. The small mountain group includes the upper part of the river Lech with it spring streams as well as the upper Großwalsertal. The first hut was opened in 1894 by the Freiburg section of the German and Austrian Alpine Club at lake Formarinsee. Because of the great popularity another hut named Freiburger hut was opened in 1912 on the Rauhen Joch, as well as the Ravensburger hut near the Spullersee in the same year.

The Lechquellen mountains are little developed, apart from the large ski resorts and railways at Lech and Zürs. Narrow toll roads lead to the valleys, and a shuttle bus from Lech leads to the Lechquellen in summer. On the other hand, it is ideal for hikers and there is a system of mountain huts connected by a mountain path which follows the entire "horseshoe" of the peaks, but requires some alpine experience - at least until the middle of the summer.

The western ramp of the Arlberg railway follows the southern edge of the Lechquellen mountains. Its power is supplied by hydroelectricity from the overflow of the Spullersee, which lies at a height of 700 metres above the Klostertal valley in the southern part of the Lechquellen mountains.

=== Alpine Club huts ===
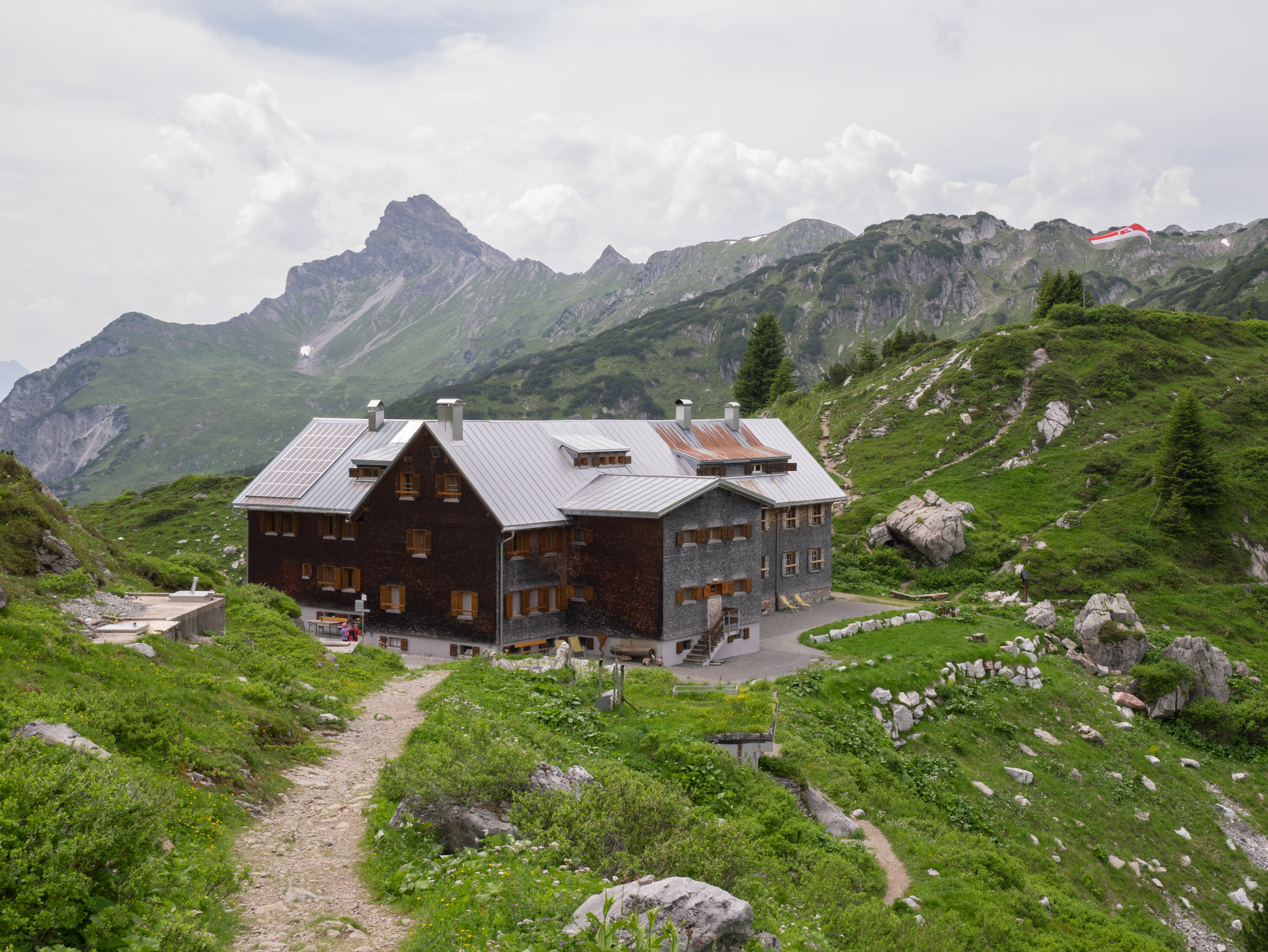
Freiburger Hut

There are five Alpine Club huts in the mountains:

- Biberacher Hut 1,842 m above sea level (AA)
- Frassen Hut 1,725 m above sea level (AA)
- Freiburger Hut 1,931 m above sea level (AA)
- Göppinger Hut 2,245 m above sea level (AA)
- Ravensburger Hut 1,948 m above sea level (AA)

These huts, with the exception of the Frassen Hut, are part of the Lechquellenrunde.

=== Long-distance paths ===
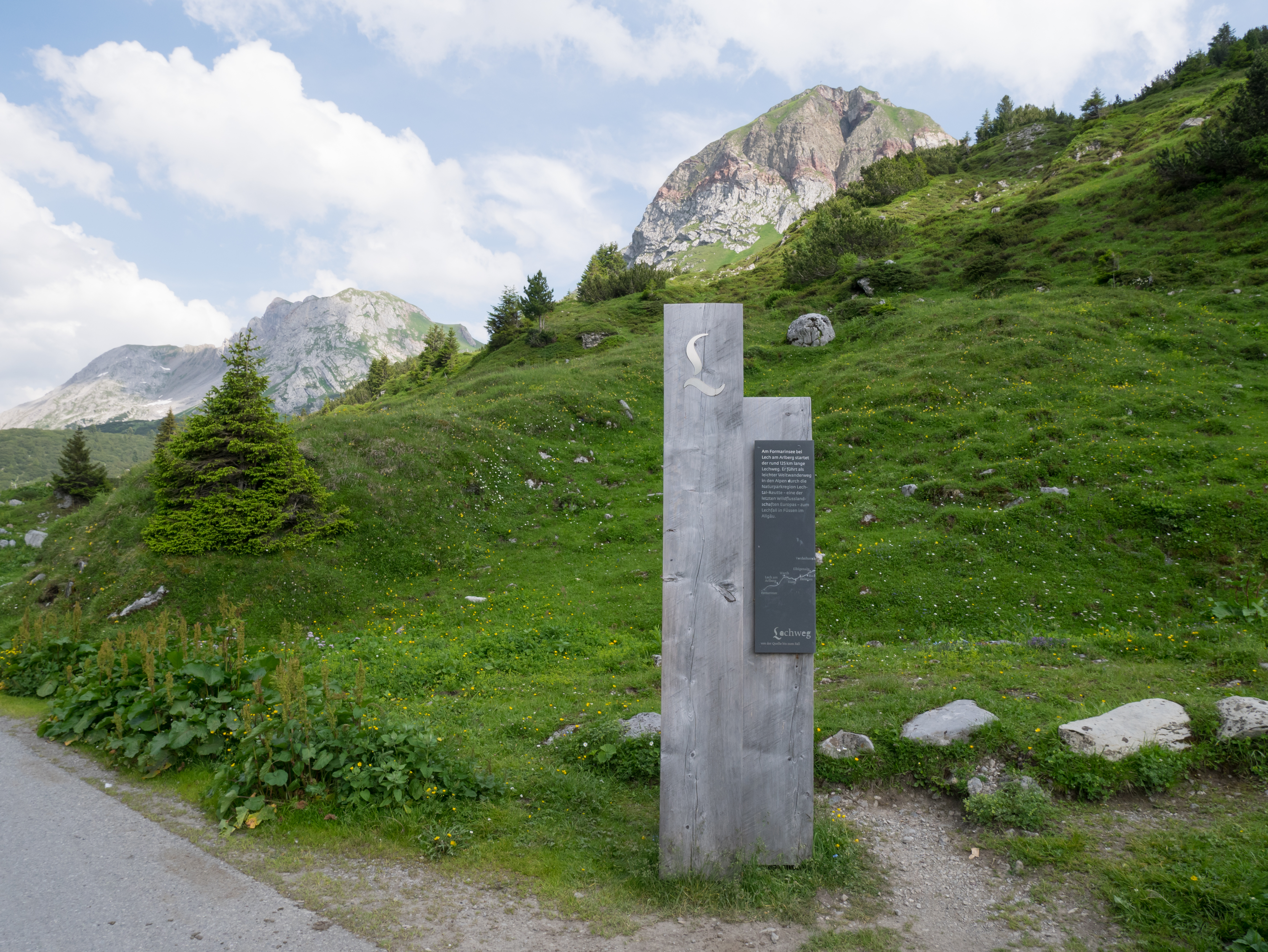
Start of the Lechweg trail

North Alpine long-distance path 01, the Limestone Alps Way (Kalkalpenweg), crosses the Lechquellen as follows:

- Section 17 runs from Zürs to Damüls via the Madlochjoch, the Ravensburger Hut, the Freiburger Hut, the Göppinger Hut and the Biberacher Hut. The last section from the Faschinajoch to Damüls runs through the Bregenz Forest Mountains.

The Via Alpina, a cross-border long-distance path with five sections through the whole Alps, also runs through the Lechquellen Mountains.

The Red Trail of the Via Alpina (Rote Weg der Via Alpina) has 3 stages running through the Lechquellen as follows:

- Stage R52 runs from the Mindelheimer Hut to Schröcken. This stage is mainly in the Allgäu Alps. Making its way between the Hochtannberg Pass and Schröcken past the Kälbelesee and Körbersee it also enters the Lechquellen.
- Stage R53 runs from Schröcken to Buchboden over the Schadona Pass (Biberacher Hut).
- Stage R54 runs from Buchboden to St. Gerold. The second part of this stage is located in the Bregenz Forest Mountains.

The Lechweg runs 125 km from lake Formarinsee to the Lechfall in Füssen (Germany).

=== Fixed rope routes ===
- Fixed rope route (DE: Klettersteig) on the Karhorn (2416 m)
- Panorama Klettersteig
- Francesco Tarmann Klettersteig (Ludesch)

== Nature protection ==
The biosphere reserve Großwalsertal also covers parts of the Lechquellen Mountains. Particularly interesting are the core zones, which, according to UNESCO, must be part of every biosphere reserve. In the Lechquellen mountains there are two larger core zones, the Gadental and the area Faludriga Nova. The mountain forests in these core zones have not been used for a number of years in forestry. As a result, these core zones already present today the image of natural mountainous (virgin) forests with trees of different age classes and a high proportion of dead-wood in the Northern Limestone Alps.

There are the following nature reserves:

- Gadental, established 1987, size 1.336 ha
- Gipslöcher Oberlech, established 1988, size 21 ha
- Bödener Magerwiesen, established 1991, size 16,5 ha
- Faludriga Nova, established 2003

Plant protection area:

- Körbersee, established 1958, size 451 ha

Natura-2000-areas:

- Bergwälder Klostertal
- Gadental, established 1995, size 1.543,77 ha
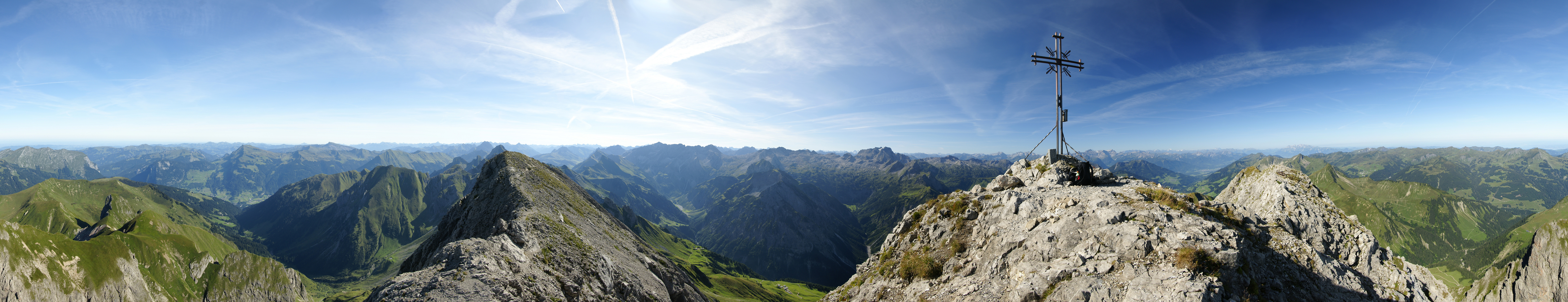
360° panorama from the summit of the Zitterklapfen (2,403 m)
