= Rotwand =

Rotwand ("Red Wall" or "Red Face") or variation, is the name of several well-known peaks in the Alps:

- Sextener Rotwand (2,965 m s.l.m.), in the Sexten Dolomites of South Tyrol
- Rotwand (Rosengarten Group) (2,806 m s.l.m.), in the Rosengarten Group near the Karer Pass in South Tyrol
- Rotwand (Allgäu Alps) (2,262 m above sea level (AA)), in the Allgäu Alps in Tyrol
- Rotwand (Bavaria) (1,884 m above NN), in the Mangfall Mountains near Bayrischzell in Bavaria
- Rotwandlspitze (German: Red Wall Peak), a mountain in Bavaria, Germany
- Rote Wand (German: Red Wall), a mountain in Austria

== See also ==
- Redwall (disambiguation)
- Wand (disambiguation)
- Rote (disambiguation)
- Rot (disambiguation)
