= Roggalspitze =

Mountain in Austria

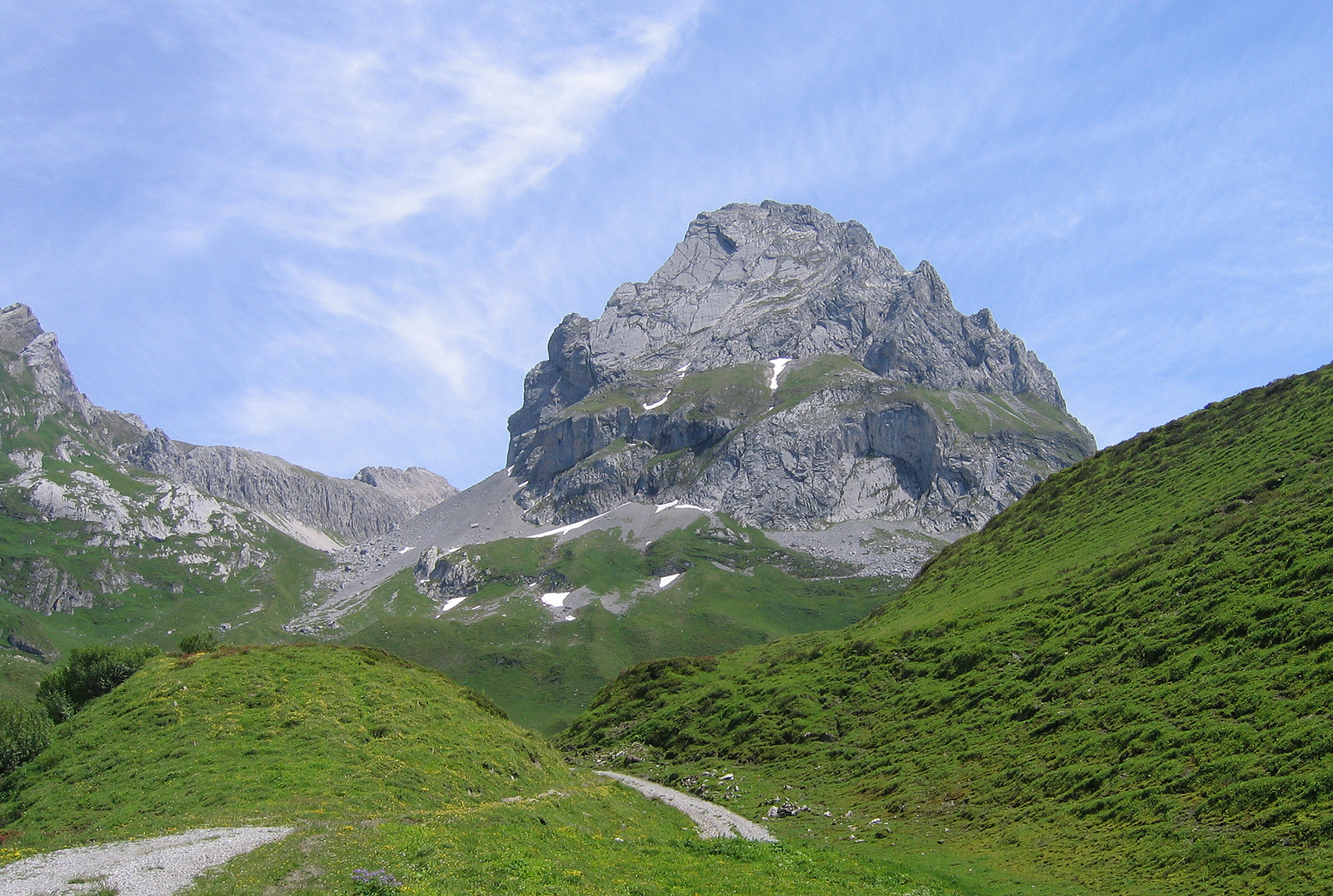
- Roggalspitze, west side

Highest point
- Elevation: 2,673 m (AA) (8,770 ft)
- Coordinates: 47°09′58″N 10°07′03″E

Geography
- Location within Austria
- Location: Vorarlberg, Austria
- Parent range: Lechquellen Mountains

Climbing
- First ascent: A. Madlener 1877
- Normal route: Southeast side (Climbing grade II-)

The Roggalspitze is a peak, 2,673 m (AA), in the Lechquellen Mountains, in the Austrian state of Vorarlberg. It is considered one of the most attractive climbing peaks in the range. The name of the mountain is derived from the Romansh word rocca, which means "rock" or "crag".

== Location and area ==
The Roggalspitze is a steep, rocky peak made of light Upper Rhaetian Limestone, which rises above the alm of the Brazer Staffel in the east of the Lechquellen range. To the south a rocky arête runs across to the 2,753 m Untere Wildgrubenspitze.

== Ascent ==
From the Ravensburger Hut the summit may be reached in 3 hours on the normal route through the schrofen terrain of the southeast side. The route, which is protected with wire cable in places, has numerous grade II- (UIAA) climbing sections. The Roggalspitze is well known, however, for its climbing routes, especially the ascent up the north face (IV+). Other well known routes are the southwest arête (IV), west face (IV), southeast arête (III), east face (V/VI) and northeast tower (VI). In addition, there are shorter routen and variants of up to grade VIII-.

== Literature / maps ==
- Alpine Club map 3/2 Lechtaler Alpen, Arlberggebiet (1:25,000 scale topographic map series)
