= Wand (disambiguation) =

A wand is a thin, straight, hand-held stick of wood, ivory, or metal.

Wand may also refer to:

== People ==
- Bruce Wands, an American digital artist and educator
- Günter Wand, a German orchestra conductor and composer
- Hart Wand, an early white American blues musician and composer from Oklahoma City
- John W C Wand, an Anglican archbishop of Brisbane, Australia
- Seth Wand, an American football offensive tackle
- Walter Rudi Wand, a German judge
- Wand Bewossen, a military figure in Ethiopian history
- Wanderlei Silva, Brazilian mixed martial artist

== Music ==
- Wand (band), an American psychedelic rock band
- Wands (band), a 3-member Japanese rock music group
- Wand Records, a record company
- "The W.A.N.D. (The Will Always Negates Defeat)," a song by The Flaming Lips

== Media ==
- WAND (TV), an NBC affiliate in Decatur, Illinois
- "The Wand", an episode of Adventure Time on season one DVD
- "The Wand" (The Amazing World of Gumball), an episode of The Amazing World of Gumball
- Nyko Wand, a 3rd-party alternative to the Wii Remote

== Erotic ==
- Wand vibrator, a type of vibrator
- Prince's wand, a piece of body piercing jewellery
- Violet wand, a device used for the application of low current, high voltage, high frequency electricity to the body

== Other uses ==
- Suit of wands, a card suit used in tarot
- Wand (Wall), a 1994 painting by Gerhard Richter
- Women's Action for New Directions, a nonprofit organization
- W And, a variable star

== See also ==
- Magic wand (disambiguation)
