= Mohnenfluh =

Mountain in Vorarlberg, Austria

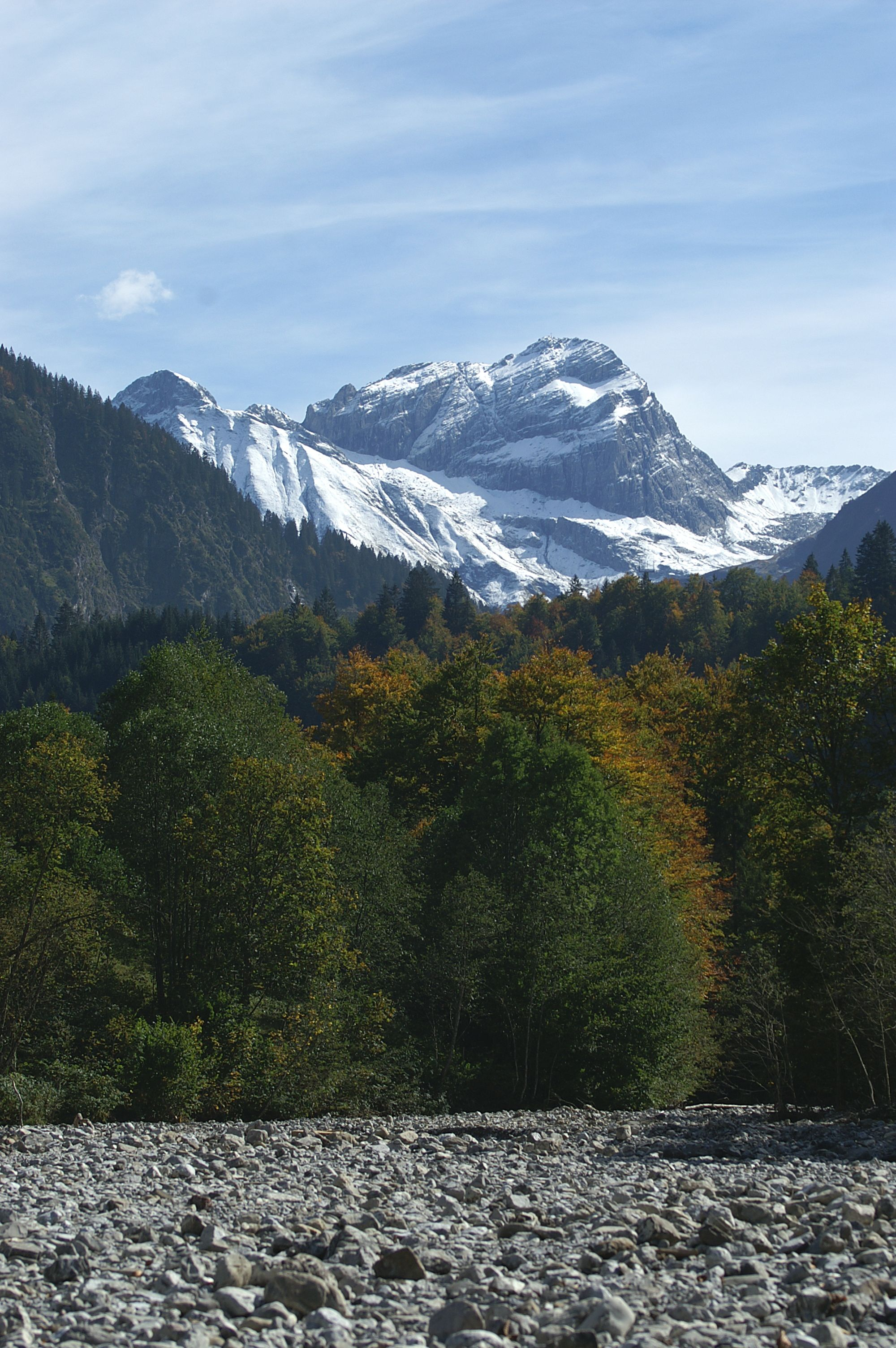
- Mohnenfluh, view over the Bregenzer Ach

Highest point
- Elevation: 2,544 m (AA) (8,346 ft)
- Prominence: 385 m ↓ southwestern Butzensee
- Isolation: 2.13 km → Butzenspitze
- Listing: Prominent mountains of the Alps
- Coordinates: 47°13′57″N 10°6′9″E

Geography
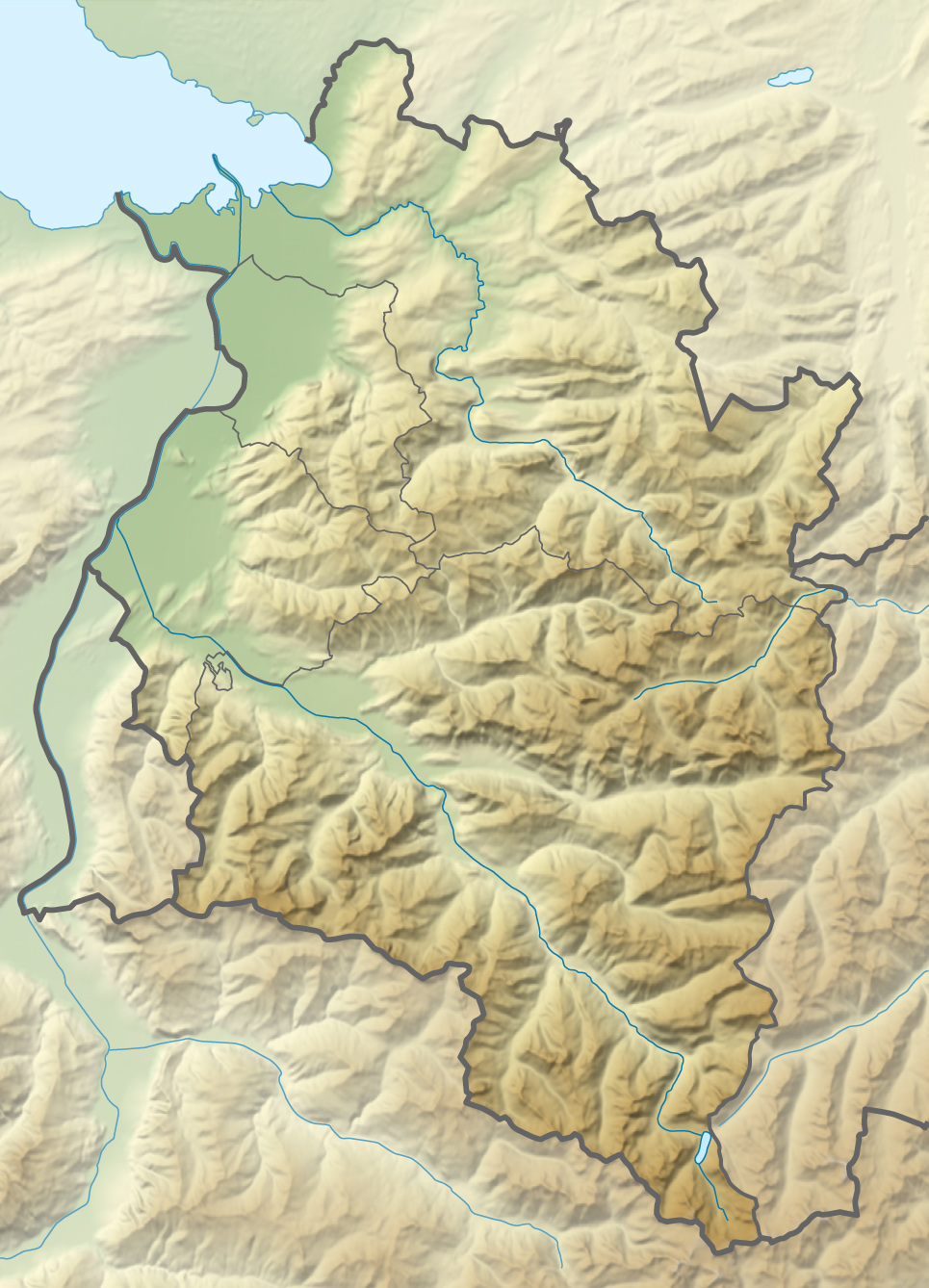
- Location within Vorarlberg Location within Austria
- Location: Vorarlberg, Austria
- Parent range: Lechquellen Mountains

The Mohnenfluh is a 2,544-metre (8,346 ft) high mountain in the Austrian state of Vorarlberg.

The Mohnenfluh is the second-highest summit in the region of Schröcken after the Braunarlspitze, and is in the Lechquellen Mountains. An ascent is usually made via the Mohnen Saddle (2,315 m) and the south arête. The Bregenzer Ach rises on the eastern flank of the Mohnenfluh above Schröcken at a height of about 2,400 metres (7,870 ft).

The name "Mohn(-en)" may be connected to the word Mond ("moon").

Because there are also mountain meadows or Bergmähder nearby, it may be derived from "Mahd" / "Mähen" ("meadow").
