= Untere Wildgrubenspitze =

Mountain in Vorarlberg, Austria

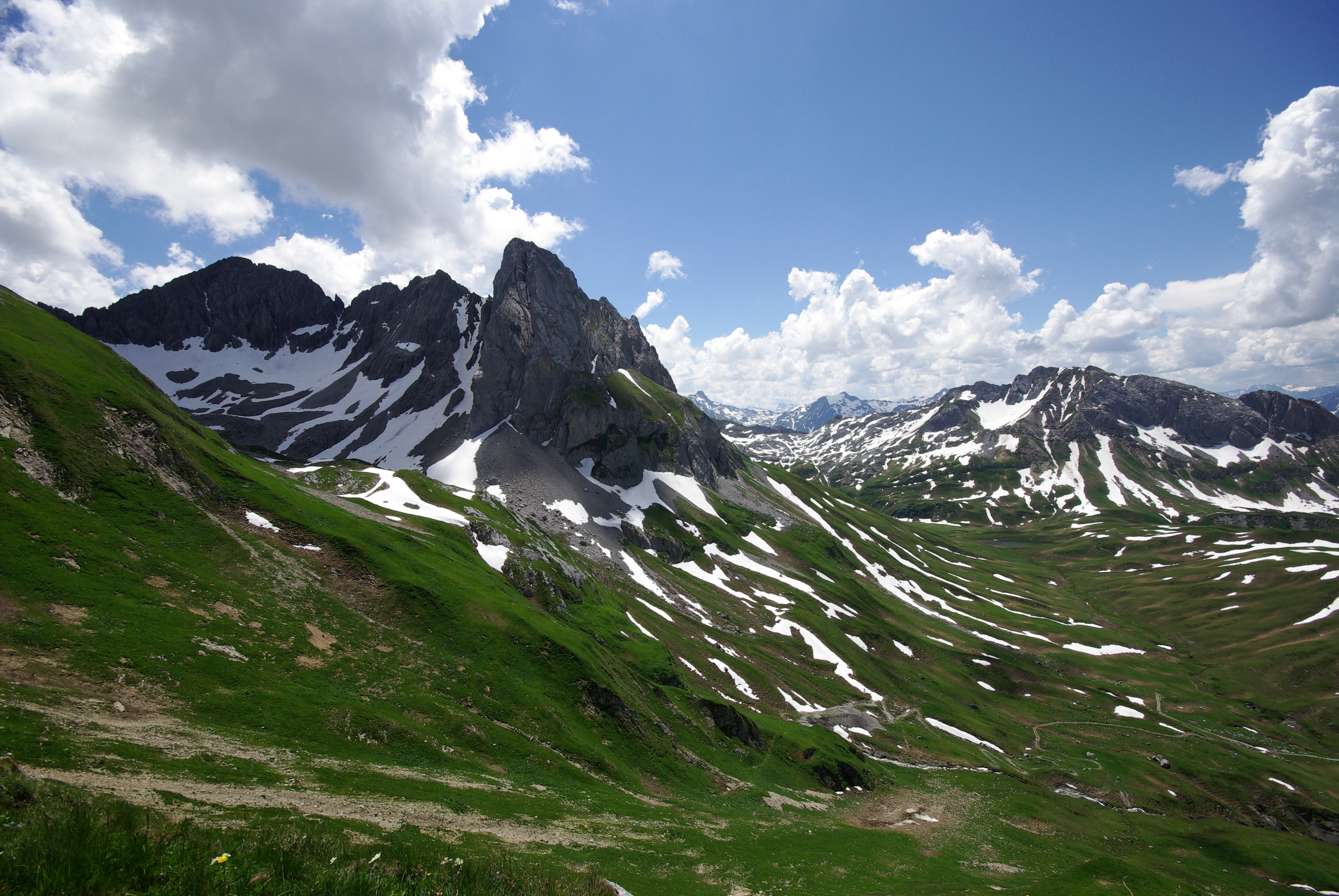
- The Untere Wildgrubenspitze (far left) and Roggalspitze (2,673 m)

Highest point
- Elevation: 2,753 m (AA) (9,032 ft)
- Prominence: 2,753-1,773 m ↓ Flexen Pass
- Isolation: 6.6 km → Valluga to Valluga
- Coordinates: 47°09′53″N 10°07′34″E

Geography
- Location within Austria
- Location: Vorarlberg, Austria
- Parent range: Lechquellen Mountains

Geology
- Rock age: Upper Carnian - Norian
- Rock type: Main dolomite

Climbing
- First ascent: 1877 by Andreas Madlener (tourist)
- Normal route: From Zürsersee, ascent protected

The Untere Wildgrubenspitze (rarely called Große Wildgrubenspitze) is the highest peak of the Lechquellen Mountains in Austria. It reaches a height of 2,753 m above sea level (AA) and is located west of the ski resort of Zürs.

The summit may be reached from the Ravensburger Hut via the Schneegrube, Nadelscharte and southwest arête. This involves grade II to III climbing. The ascent from the northern side, from the Zürsersee is easier and protected with wire cables.

Around a kilometre north is the Obere Wildgrubenspitze with a height of 2,625 m above sea level (AA).
