= Red wall =

Red wall or Redwall may refer to:

== Literature ==
- Redwall, a series of children's fantasy novels by Brian Jacques
  - Redwall (novel), the first novel in this series
  - Redwall (TV series), a 1999 animated series based on the novel series
  - Redwall: The Movie, a direct-to-video movie recompilation of season 1 of the TV series, based on the first novel "Redwall"
  - Redwall: The Adventure Game, a videogame adventure game series based on the novel series
- The Red Wall, a memoir by the Canadian policewoman Jane Hall

== Politics ==
- Red wall (British politics), traditionally Labour-voting areas in the UK, particularly in parts of the Midlands, North of England and Wales
- "Red wall" (US politics), traditionally Republican-voting areas in the US Midwest and South

== Translated term ==
- Muralla Roja, an apartment complex in Calpe, Spain
- Rote Wand, a mountain in Austria
- Rotwand (disambiguation), several mountains in the Alps, Europe
- Battle of Monastir (1917), World War I battle, in Bulgarian called Битка за Червена стена (Bitka za Chervena Stena, lit. 'Battle of the Red Wall')

== Other uses ==
- The Red Wall, the nickname given to supporters of the Wales National Football Team
- Redwall Limestone or Redwall Formation, rock layer that forms prominent, red-stained cliffs in the Grand Canyon, Arizona
- Redwalls, The Homestead, Sandiway, Cheshire, England, UK; a listed building on the Homestead estate
- Redwall Dam, Marble Canyon, Colorado River, Arizona, USA; a proposed impoundment dam
- Red Wall Gang, a former criminal gang in Dublin, Ireland
- The Redwalls, a U.S. rock band

== See also ==
- Wall (disambiguation)
- Red (disambiguation)
