= Rote Wand =

Mountain in the Lechquellengebirge in Vorarlberg

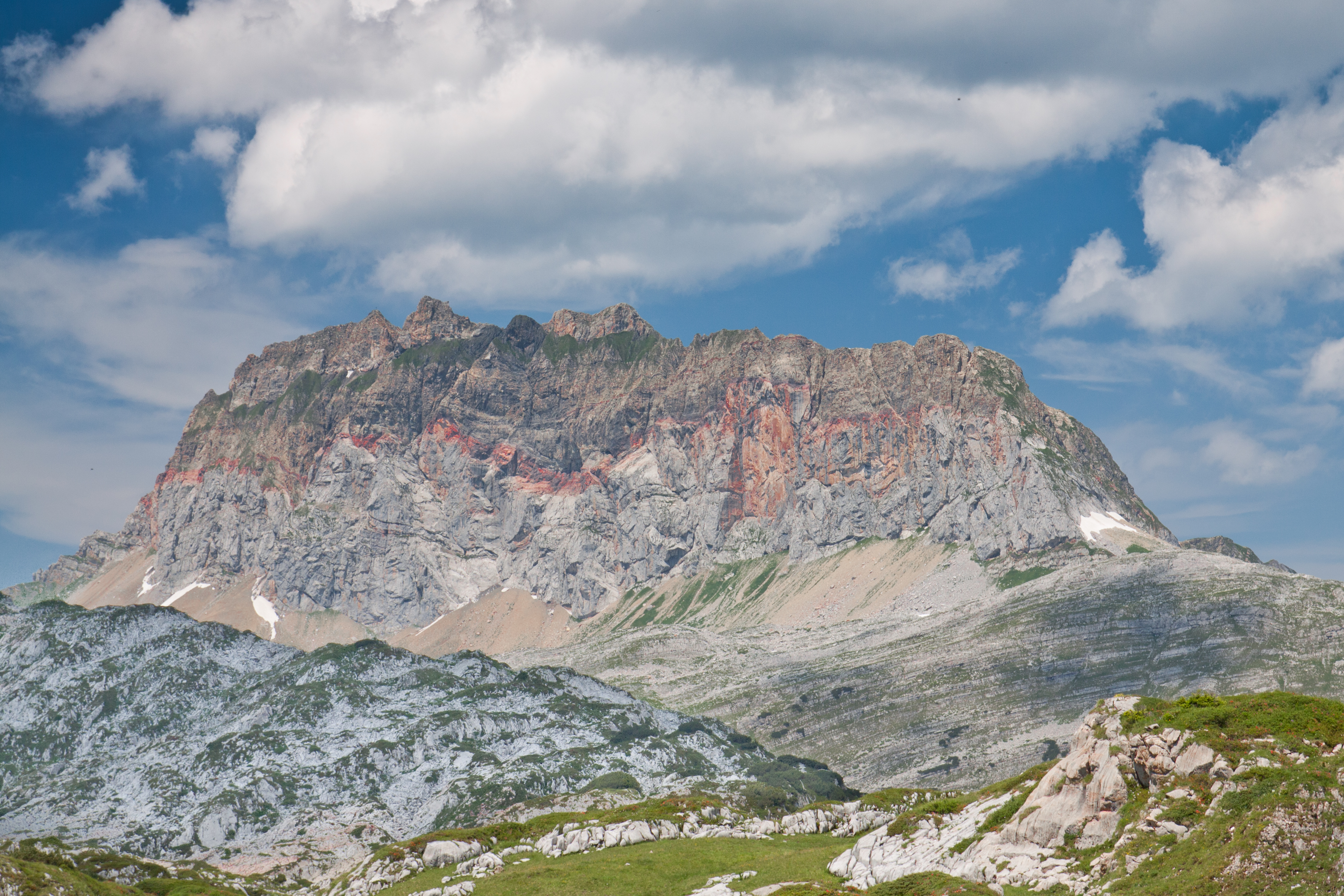

Highest point
- Elevation: 2,704 m (8,871 ft)
- Prominence: 877 m (2,877 ft)
- Isolation: 10.86 km (6.75 mi) to Untere Wildgrubenspitze
- Coordinates: 47.186111°N 9.985°E

Geography
- Location within Alps
- Location: Vorarlberg, Austria
- Parent range: Lechquellen Mountains

Climbing
- First ascent: 12 September 1867 by John Sholto Douglass and Otto Freiherr von Sternbach

The Rote Wand ("Red Wall") is a mountain in the Lechquellen Mountains range of Vorarlberg, in western Austria.

The second highest mountain at 2,704 m (AA) in the range, behind the lower pit Wildgrubenspitze (2,753 metres (9,032 ft)) in the mountains of Lech sources, it rises from the valley floor between the Großes Walsertal in the north, and Dalaas (Monastery Valley) in the south. The name "Red Wall (Rote Wand)" originates from the distinct red-Lias limestone, which is particularly striking in the south wall. On the north side is a small glacier.

The mountain is a popular hiking destination, but designated only for experienced, sure-footed mountain walkers. The route can be accessed from the Alpe Laguz, Alpe Klesenza, the Freiburger hut and the Formarinsee. All routes lead via a very steep climb up the north-west flank, via the north ridge to the summit.

The first described ascent was by Otto Freiherr von Sternbach and John Sholto Douglass in 1867, following a route explored but not finished by Anton Neyer from Bludenz and the guide Ferdinand Heine in the 1840s. However, the peak had been reached before by unknown climbers as Douglass and Sternbach found a signal pole on the summit. After 1867 the mountain was a popular destination for mountaineers. In 1874 John Sholto Douglass, a Scot, who had adopted the Vorarlberg for his homeland, fell to his death near the Rote Wand while hunting chamois.

In much literature the first ascent is ascribed to David Pappus and companions on 25 July 1610 during his exploration of the borders of the Sonnenberg and Bludenz Counties. Pappus however did not mention this in his detailed account. The "Rote Wand" that he did describe climbing is the 2,105 m high Garsellakopf on the border with Liechtenstein.
