= Magic wand (disambiguation) =

A magic wand is an object used in stage magic or supernatural magic.

Magic wand may also refer to:

- Magic Wand (software), a word-processing program for CP/M-based computers first released in 1979
- Magic Wand Speak & Learn, an electronic educational toy introduced in 1982 by Texas Instruments
- Hitachi Magic Wand, a well-known brand of wand vibrator
- Magic Wand (missile defense), or David's Sling, an Israeli-American interception system
- Magic Wands, an American musical group
- Magic wand, a selection tool in image-editing software
- Magic wand, an operator in separation logic
