= Magic Wand Speak & Learn =

Educational gadget

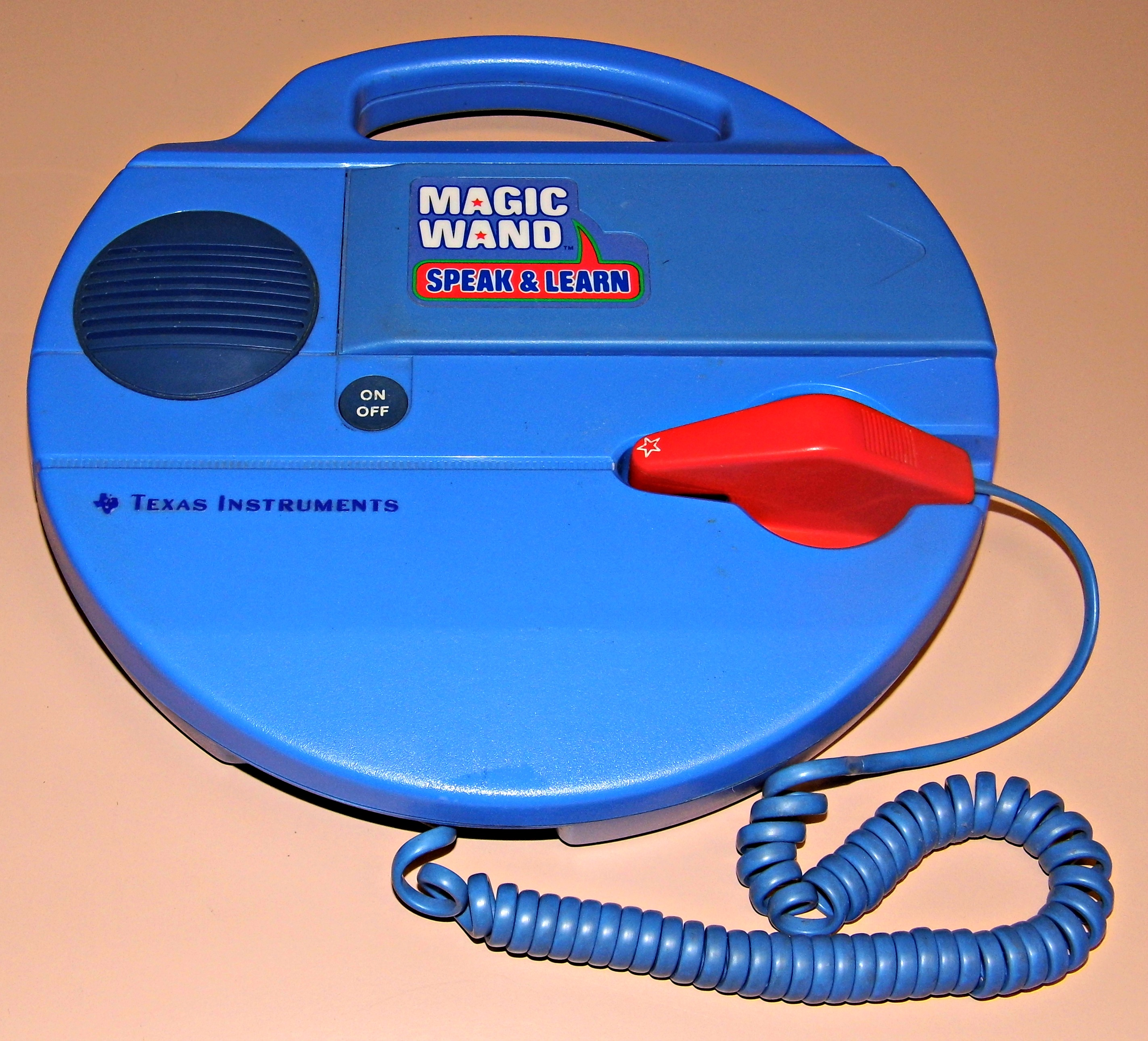
The Magic Wand Reader device.

Produced by Texas Instruments, the Magic Wand Reader (introduced in 1982 as the Magic Wand Speaking Reader) was an educational device that used a handheld wand that one would slide over "Talking Tracks" in order to read along with educational books.

Bill Cosby was initially a spokesman for this device.

== The Magic Wand Speaking Library ==
=== Skill Levels ===
Different levels of activities and short stories were available.

- Level 1 - Toddler
- Level 2 - Preschool
- Level 3 - Early Elementary

=== Series ===
- Green - Early Readers
- Cyan - Letters, Numbers, Words (Basics) (Note: The series were listed slightly differently on the back of the pack-in book Mac's Big Surprise)
- Blue - Favorite Characters and Famous Faces (Sprites' Adventures)
- Purple - Information
- Orange - Fun and Laughter
- Yellow - Classics, Folk Tales and Legends
- Brown - Magical Adventures (Magic Creatures)

=== Books ===
- Mac's Big Surprise (Pack-in book) ISBN 0-89512-058-5

== In popular culture ==
Clips of the Magic Wand Reader's voice were sampled and used by C418 for the tracks Droopy Likes Your Face and Droopy Likes Ricochet in Life Changing Moments Seem Minor in Pictures. These same samples were used again in the track Droopy Remembers from 148.
