= Rote =

Rote can refer to:

== People ==
- Jason Butler Rote, American TV writer
- Kyle Rote (1928–2002), American football player and father of:
- Kyle Rote, Jr. (born 1950), American soccer player
- Tobin Rote (1928–2000), American quarterback in the National, American and Canadian Football Leagues

== Other uses ==
- Rote learning
- Rote Island, an island in Indonesia
- Rotenese people, an ethnic group from Rote Island
- Rotte, rotte, rote or rota, medieval psaltery
- Rote (musical instrument), a Celtic musical instrument
- Rotte, rote, rotte, rota, rotta, a lyre.
- Return on tangible equity, an economic concept
