= W Andromedae =

Variable star in the constellation Andromeda

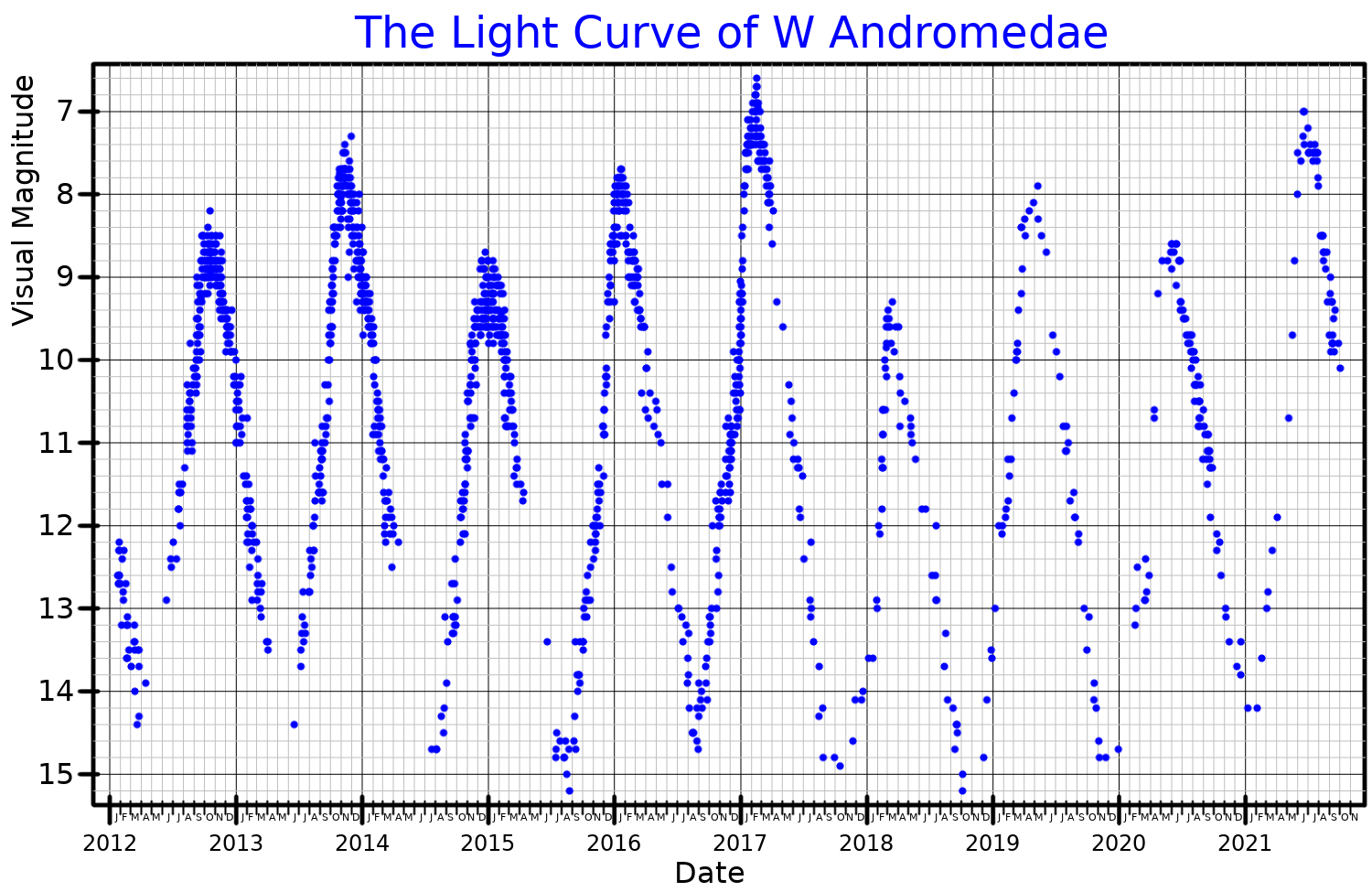
- The visual band light curve of W Andromedae, from AAVSO data

Observation data Epoch J2000 Equinox ICRS
- Constellation: Andromeda
- Right ascension: 02^{h} 17^{m} 32.96122^{s}
- Declination: +44° 18′ 17.7573″
- Apparent magnitude (V): 6.7 – 14.6

Characteristics
- Evolutionary stage: AGB
- Spectral type: S6,1e-S9,2e
- Variable type: Mira

Astrometry
Radial velocity (R_{v})	−38.19±0.4 km/s
Proper motion (μ)	RA: −0.152 mas/yr Dec.: −2.516 mas/yr
Parallax (π)	2.2125±0.0953 mas
Distance	1,470 ± 60 ly (450 ± 20 pc)
Absolute magnitude (M_{V})	−5.27

Details
Mass	5.6 M_{☉}
Luminosity	8,394 L_{☉}
Surface gravity (log g)	−0.61 cgs
Temperature	3,030 K
Metallicity [Fe/H]	0.003 dex

Other designations
- HD 14028, BD+43 461a, HIP 10687, HR 663

Database references
SIMBAD	data

W Andromedae is a variable star in the constellation of Andromeda. It is classified as a Mira variable and S-type star, and varies from an apparent visual magnitude of 14.6 at minimum brightness to a magnitude of 6.7 at maximum brightness, with a period of approximately 397.3 days.

W Andromedae was discovered by Thomas David Anderson in 1899.

W Andromedae is an S-type AGB star, in the process of expelling its red giant envelope into space. Line emission from the 115 GHz rotational transition of carbon monoxide was detected in 1986 by Benjamin Zuckerman et al. The width of the emission line indicated that the star is surrounded by a circumstellar envelope expanding at 11 km/sec. The star is losing mass due to stellar winds at a rate of 2.79×10^{−7} M_{☉}/yr.
