= Valluga =

Mountain in the Lechtal Alps, Austria

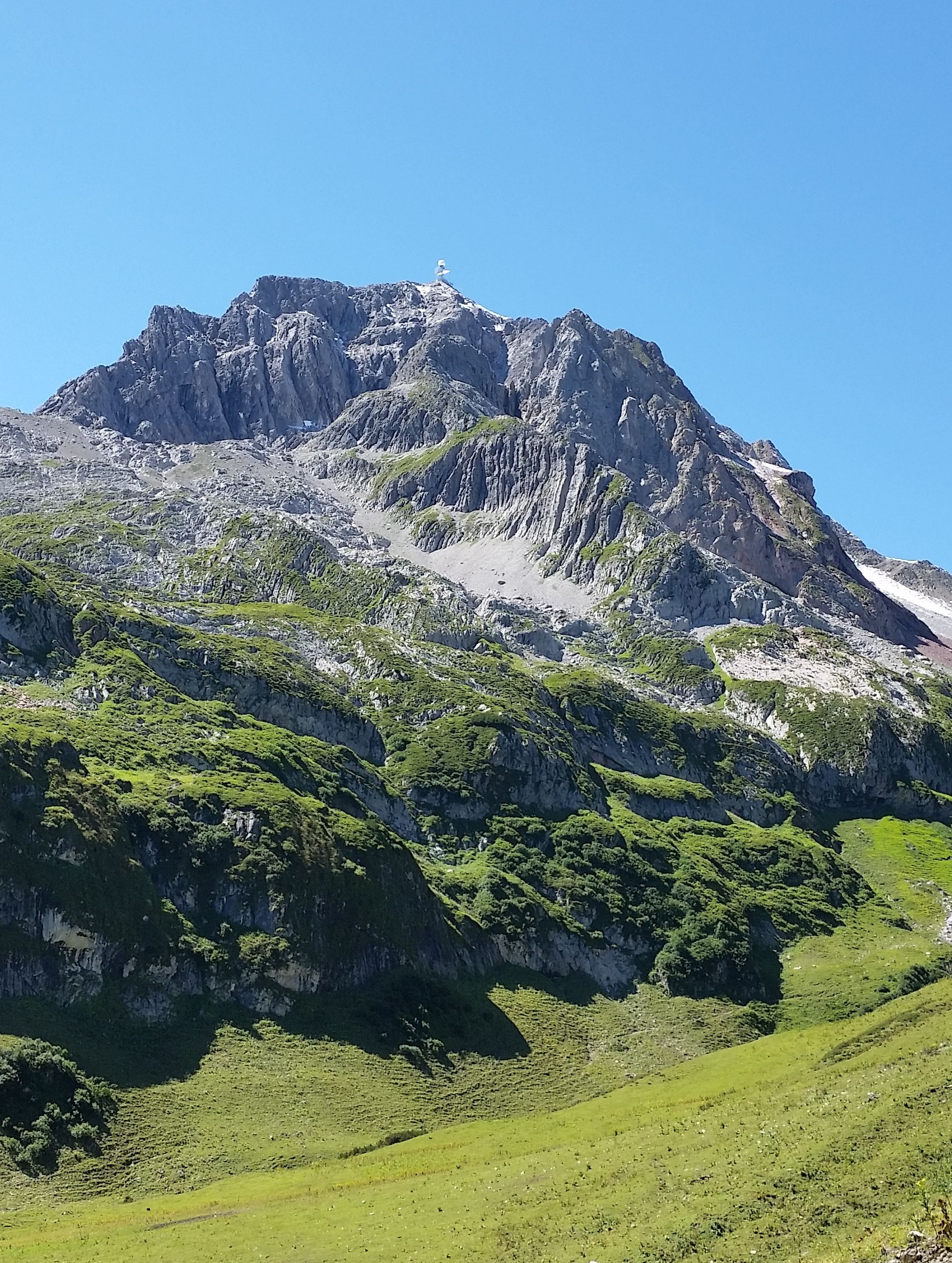
- Valluga as seen from Alpe Erlach

Highest point
- Elevation: 2,809 m (9,216 ft)
- Prominence: 572 m (1,877 ft)
- Isolation: 10.6 km (6.6 mi) to Große Sulzspitze
- Coordinates: 47°09′27″N 10°12′47″E

Geography
- Location within Alps
- Location: Austria
- Parent range: Lechtal Alps

Valluga is a 2,811 m (AA) high mountain in the Lechtal Alps. The border between the Austrian states Tyrol and Vorarlberg runs over the summit. It is about 3 km north of the village St. Christoph am Arlberg and the Arlberg Pass.

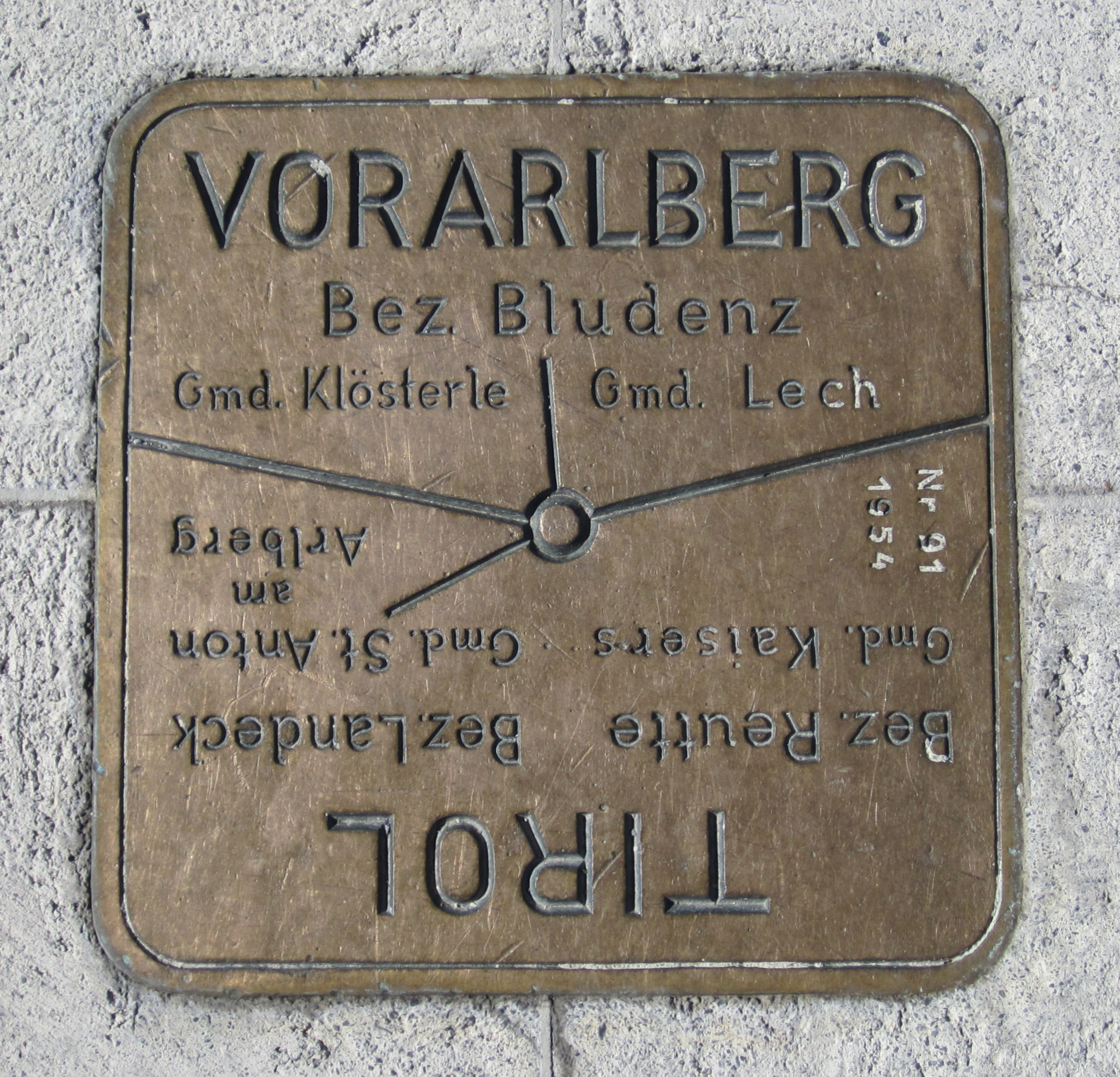
Plate on summit showing the border between Vorarlberg and Tyrol

== Vallugabahn ==
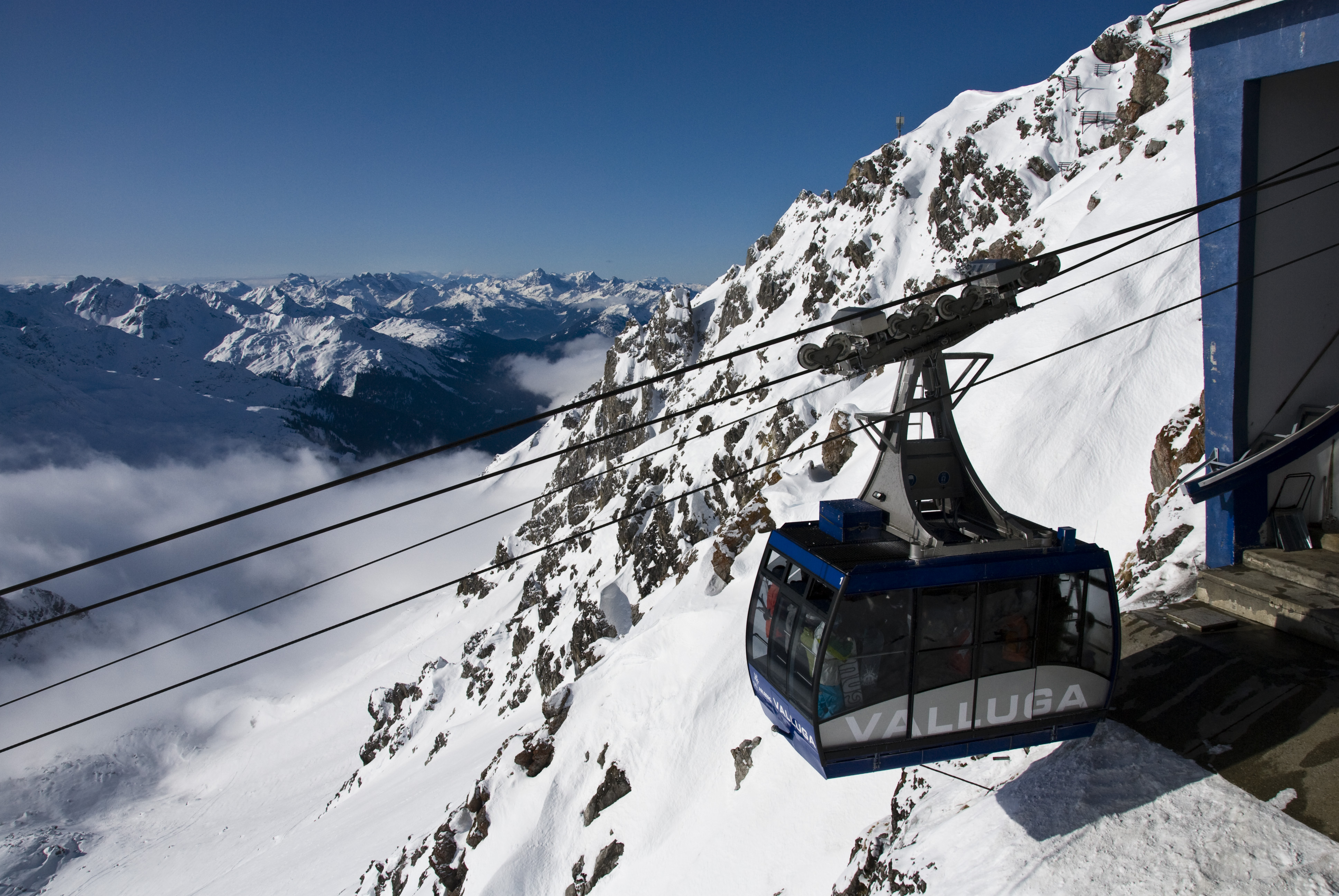
Vallugabahn 1 at upper station

The summit of Valluga is accessible by an aerial tramway called Vallugabahn. This consists of two parts:

- Vallugabahn 1 has its valley station at 2091 m and its upper station at 2648 m.
- Vallugabahn 2 has its lower station at 2642 m and its top station at 2811 m.

== Other infrastructures ==
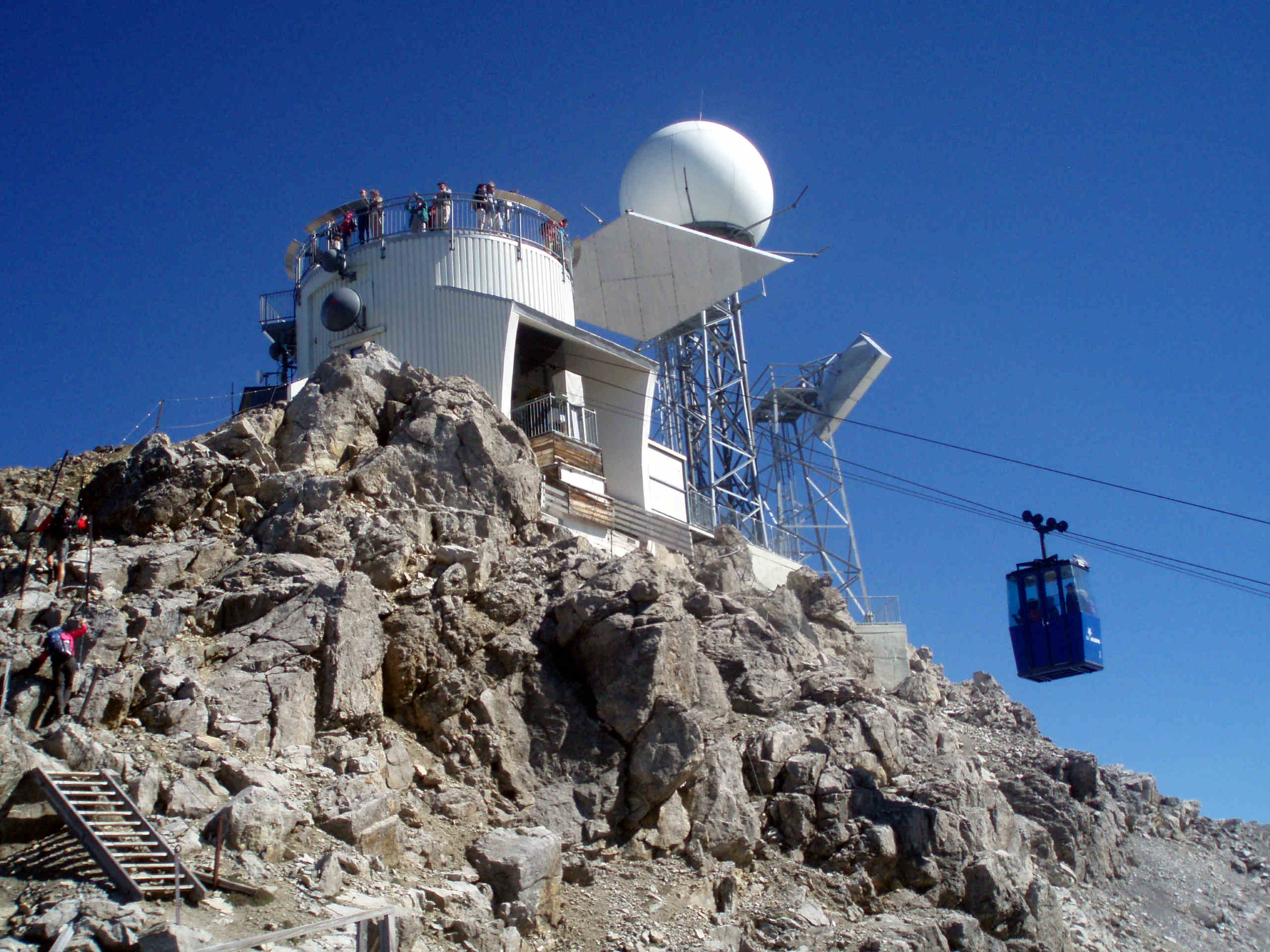
Summit of Valluga

In summer 2006 a C-band weather radar operated by Austro Control was installed on top of Valluga.

Valluga hosts some amateur radio infrastructures: a 2-meter band amateur radio repeater (uplink 145.6875 MHz, Downlink 145.0875 MHz) and a packet radio digipeater. Both have a common callsign OE7XVR. Between 2004 and 2010 there was also an amateur television repeater (callsign OE7XSI) with interlinks other repeaters in Austria, Switzerland and Germany.

== Ascents ==
Ascents from alpine club huts:

- From Ulmer Hütte (2285 m) in two hours.
- From Stuttgarter Hütte (2310 m) in two and a half hours.

Ascents from settlements:

- From Zürs (1717 m) in four hours.
