= Formarinsee =

Lake in Vorarlberg, Austria

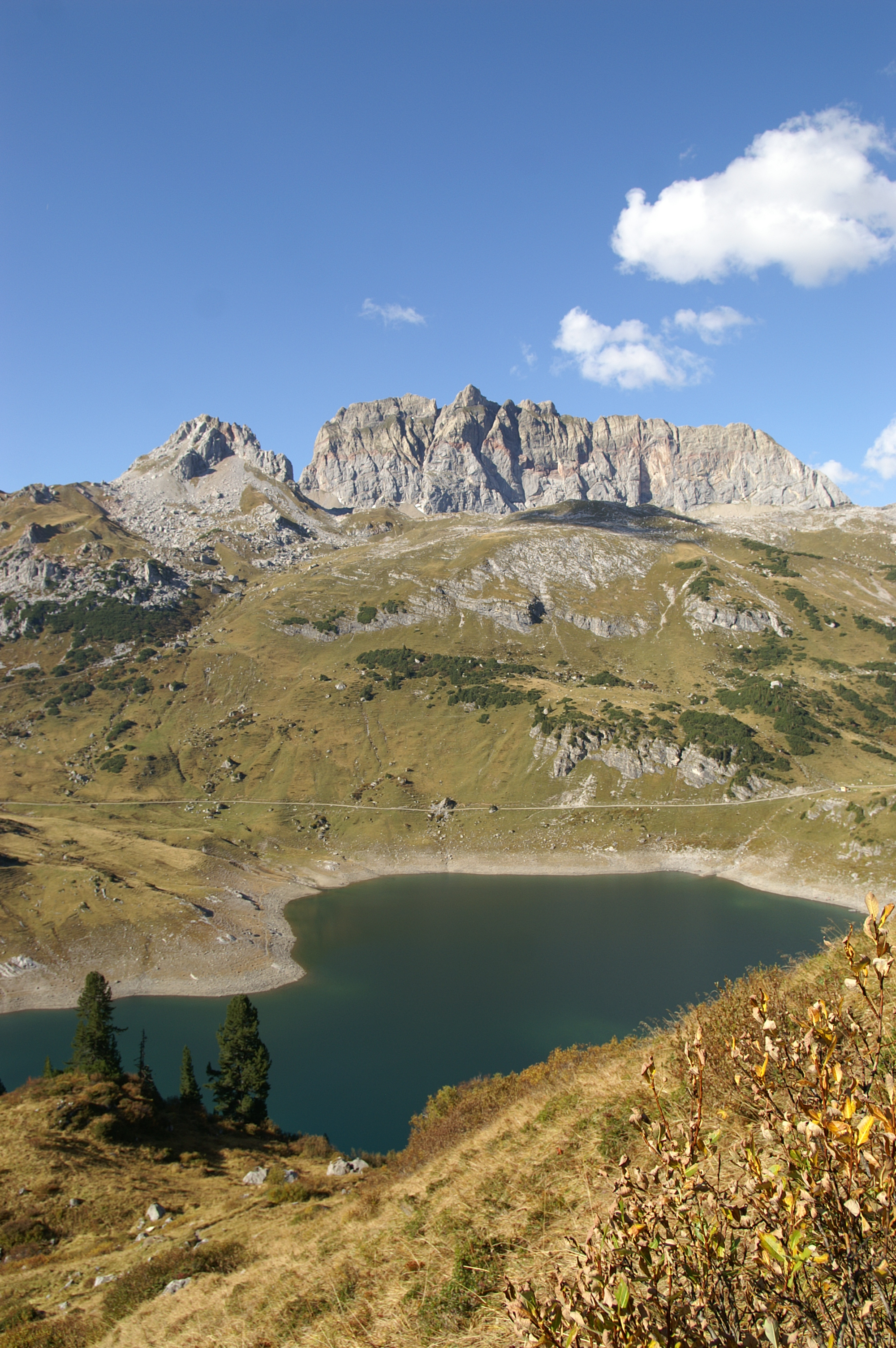

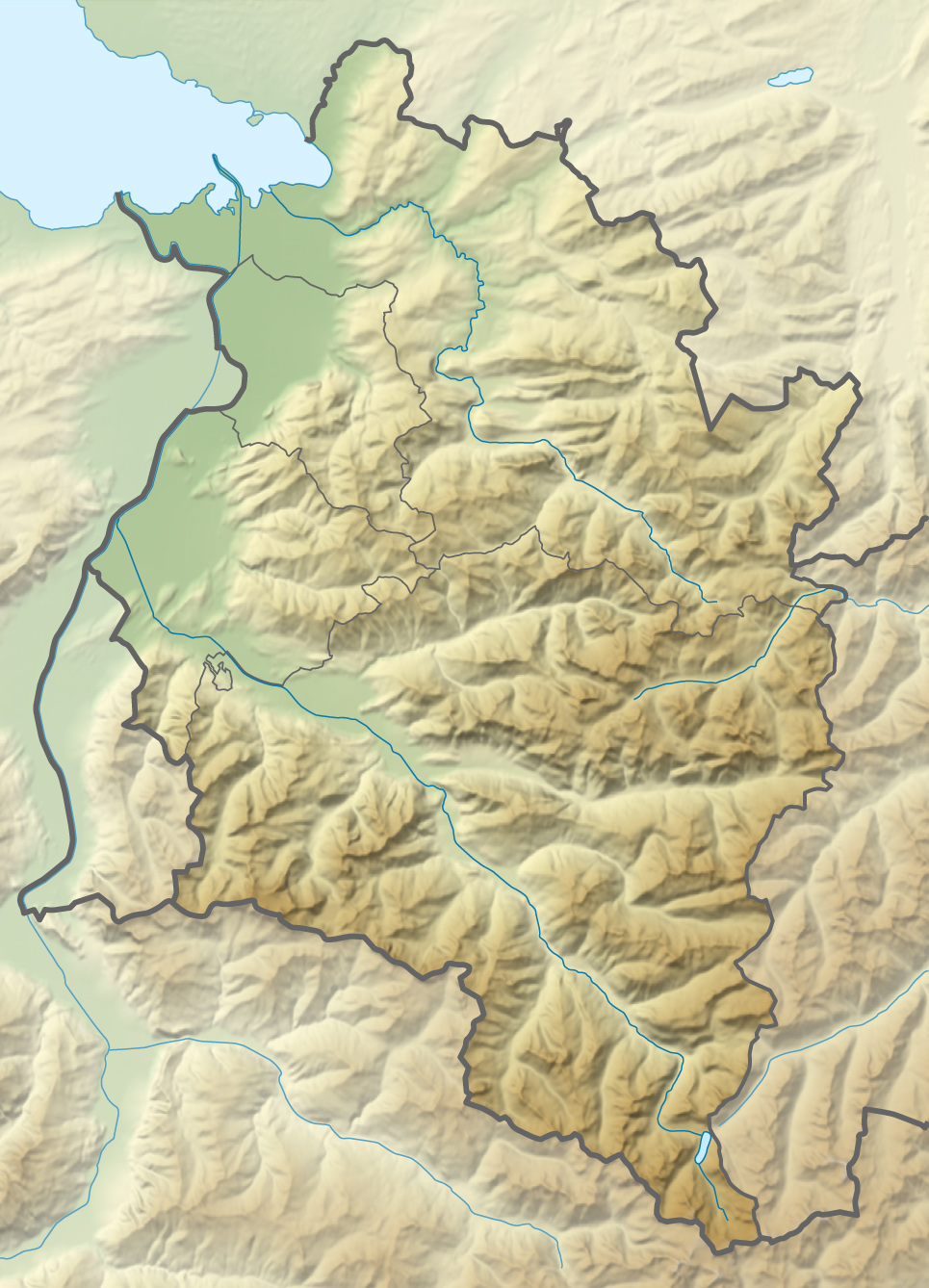
- Location within Vorarlberg
- Location: Vorarlberg
- Coordinates: 47°10′3″N 9°59′27″E
- Primary inflows: Bonabach
- Primary outflows: subterranean
- Basin countries: Austria

Formarinsee is a lake in the Austrian Alps. It lies in the Bundesland of Vorarlberg and lends its name from the mountain pasture Formarinalpe.

As part of the ORF TV program "9 places, 9 treasures", the Formarinsee with the Rote Wand (2 km north of the lake) was voted Austria's most beautiful place on 24 October 2015.
