= Ravensburger Hut =

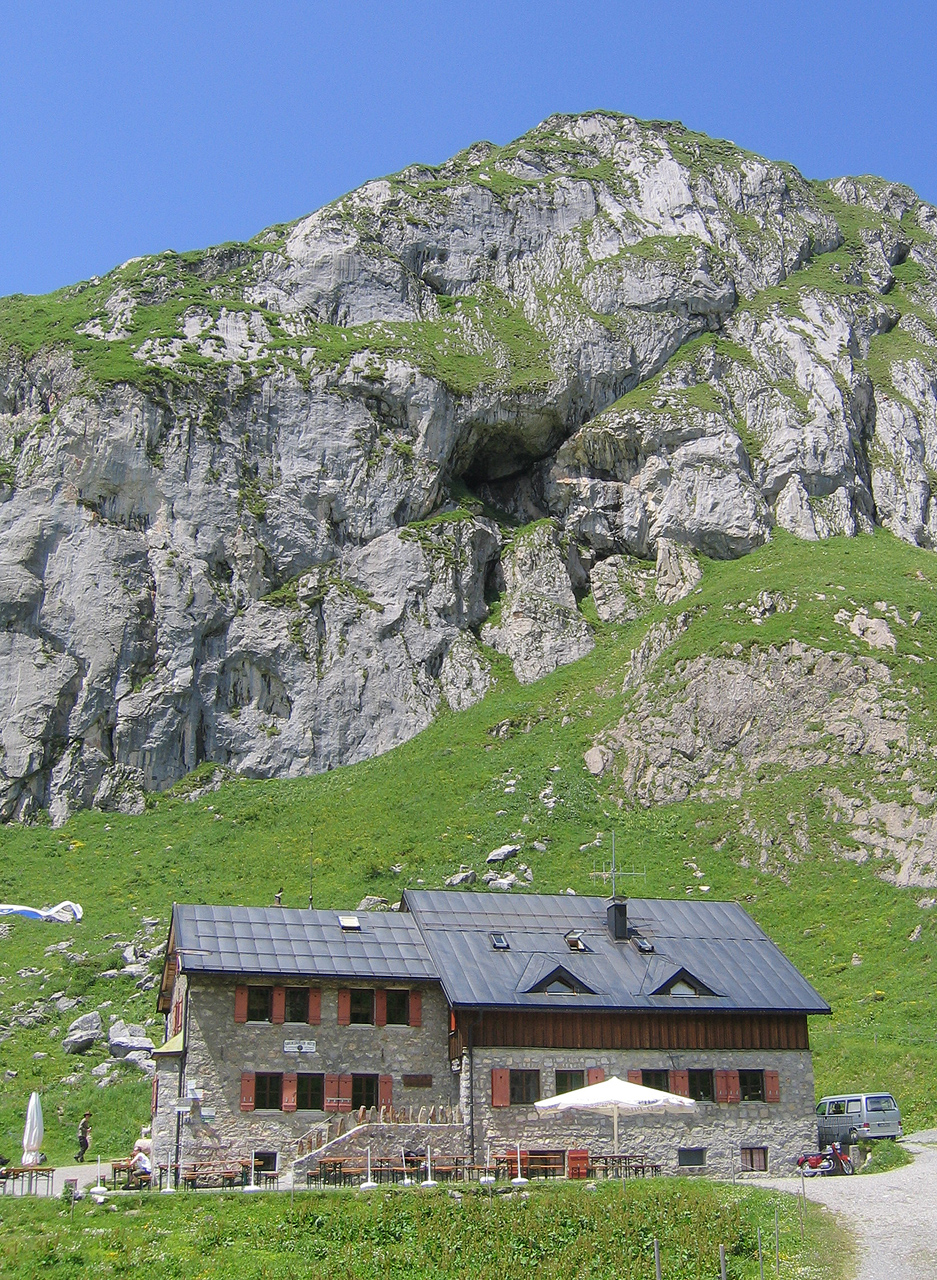
- Interactive map of the Ravensburger Hut area

General information
- Location: at the foot of the Spuller Schafberg
- Coordinates: 47.16833°N 10.09222°E
- Elevation: 1,948 m (6,391 ft)
- Year built: 1912
- Owner: DAV section Ravensburg

Website
- ravensburgerhuette.dav-ravensburg.de/%20Section%20website

The Ravensburger Hut (German: Ravensburger Hütte) is an Alpine Club hut belonging to the Ravensburg branch of the German Alpine Club (DAV). It lies in the Lechquellen Mountains at the foot of the Spuller Schafberg (near the Arlberg Pass).

== History ==
The Ravensburger Hut was built in 1912, extended 1958/59, modernised in 1974/76 and in 1988/89 a sewage treatment facility was installed.

== Ascent ==
- From Zug via the Stierlochjoch: signed, good path, steep to begin with, later gentler. From Stierlochjoch down to the hut. Bathed in sunshine in the morning, shady in the evening, 1½ to 2 hours, from Lech to Zug on an easy route another 30 minutes.
- From Klösterle / Langen via the Spuller See: ideal for railway travellers, signed, both paths merged about 45 minutes. The path from Klösterle is steeper, but is shaded in the morning. 2 to 2½ hours.
- From Spullersee: drive to the northern dam of the Spullersee (drive ca. 30 minutes on a toll road, sometimes closed). From there on foot in ca. 45 minutes to the hut.

== Literature/maps ==
- Alpine Club map 3/2 Lechtaler Alpen, Arlberggebiet. 1:25,000 topographic map series 1:25,000
- Freytag & Berndt, Sheet 372 Arlberggebiet - Paznaun Verwallgruppe 1:50,000
