= Schröcken =

- Municipality
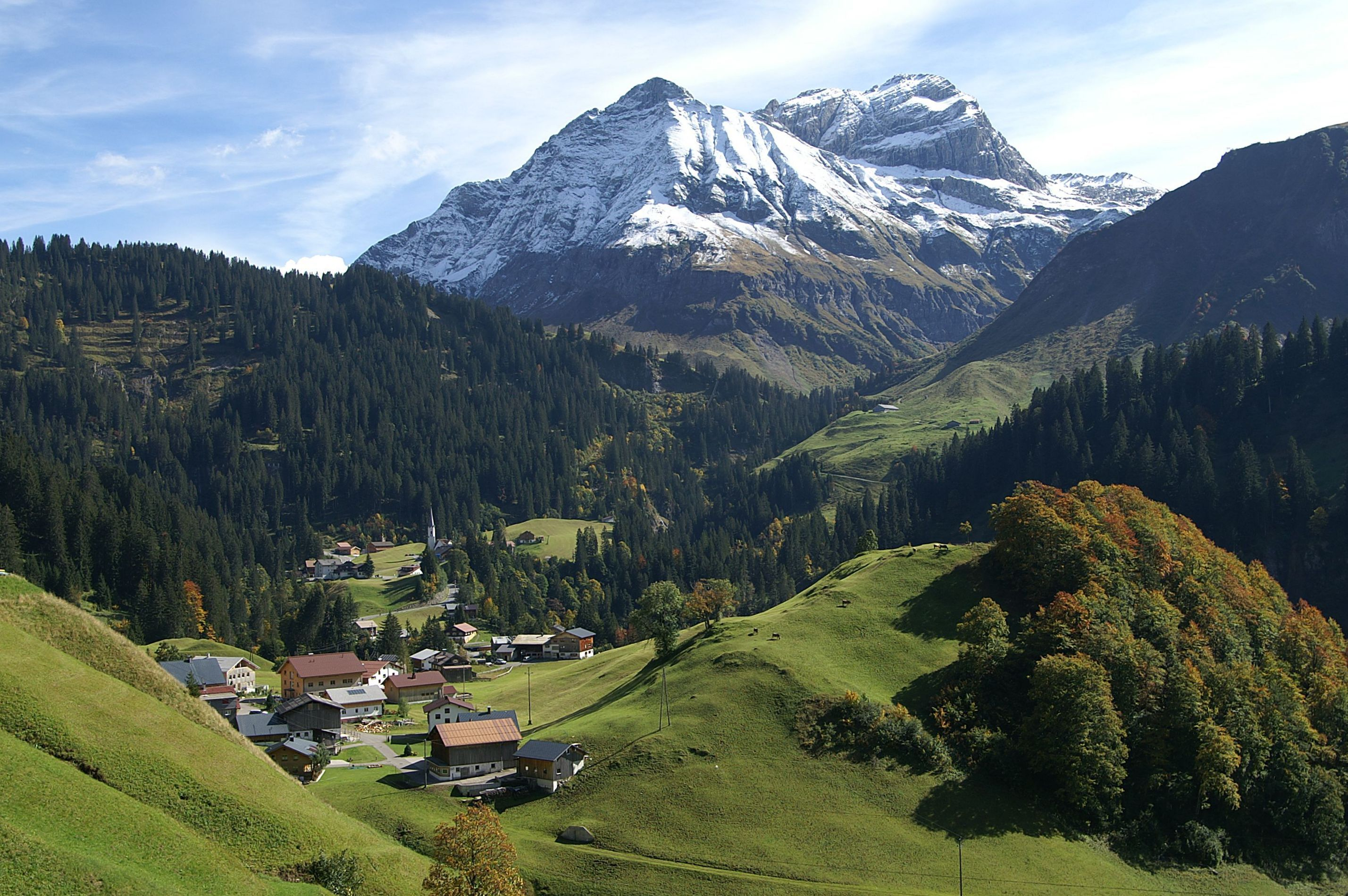

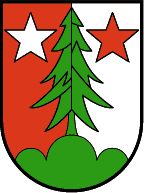
- Coat of arms

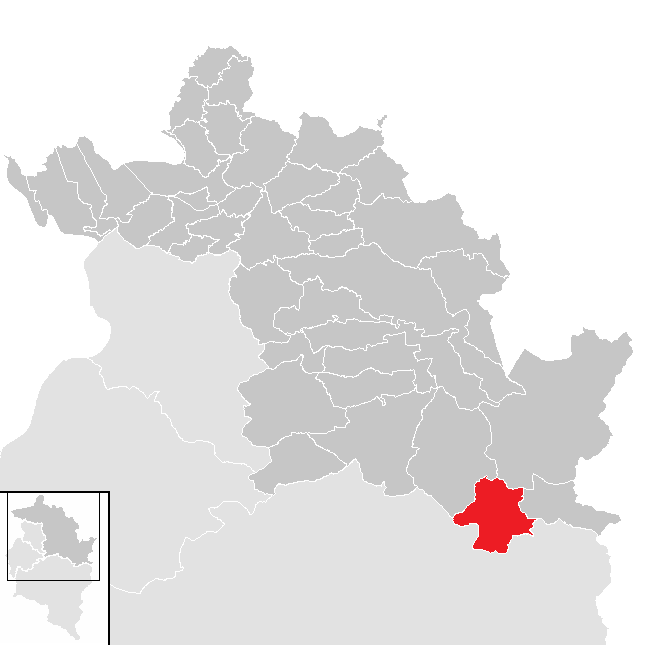
- Location in the district

- Location within Austria
- Coordinates: 47°15′00″N 10°05′00″E
- Country: Austria
- State: Vorarlberg
- District: Bregenz

Government
  - Mayor: Herbert Schwarzmann

Area
  - Total: 23.43 km^{2} (9.05 sq mi)
- Elevation: 1,269 m (4,163 ft)

Population (2018-01-01)
  - Total: 224
  - Density: 9.56/km^{2} (24.8/sq mi)
- Time zone: UTC+1 (CET)
  - Summer (DST): UTC+2 (CEST)
- Postal code: 6888
- Area code: 05519
- Vehicle registration: B
- Website: www.warth-schroecken.com

Schröcken is a municipality in the district of Bregenz, in the westernmost Austrian state of Vorarlberg.

== Geography ==
Schröcken is in the Austrian Alps, at an altitude of 1,269 meters. 12.4% of the area are forested, 39.4% Alpine area.

== History ==
The region around Schröcken was first populated around 1300 CE by German-speaking people known as the Walser, who came to Austria in from the Bernese Oberland (highlands) located in the southern part of the Canton of Bern, Switzerland. The town became part of a regional administrative area called Tannberg in 1806. From 1805 to 1814, the town was under the jurisdiction of the Free State of Bavaria. Later it reverted to become part of the Austro-Hungarian Habsburg Empire, and in 1861 was integrated into the newly founded state of Vorarlberg, Austria. From 1945 to 1955, Schröcken was part of the French occupation zone in Austria.

== Name ==
The original name was "Girsboden". "Schröcken" first appeared in the early 17th century.

== Population ==
Historical population
Year	Pop.	±%
1869	170	—
1880	177	+4.1%
1890	142	−19.8%
1900	133	−6.3%
1910	149	+12.0%
1923	130	−12.8%
1934	164	+26.2%
1939	250	+52.4%
1951	207	−17.2%
1961	196	−5.3%
1971	220	+12.2%
1981	214	−2.7%
1991	239	+11.7%
2001	233	−2.5%
2011	229	−1.7%

== Politics ==
The political administration body consists of a 9-member council and a mayor.

== Sights ==
Church of Our Lady of the Assumption The first church of Schröcken was built in 1639. The church increased its membership from 1726 to 1732, but the building was destroyed by fire in 1863. A rebuilding effort took place between 1864 and 1867, when it was re-consecrated. The church is surrounded by a walled cemetery.

Chapel of the Annunciation 18th century neo-Gothic chapel, consecrated in 1779.

== Economy ==
Tourism is the main economic enterprise, with an emphasis on outdoor activities including, skiing, hiking, and other mountain sports.

== Transportation ==
There is public transportation provided by Wälderbus 40 or 42, which connects with the broader Vorarlberg-Austrian-European network. The main road is the Bregenzerwald Bundesstraße 200.

== Education ==
The town has a primary school and a kindergarten.

== Climate ==
Climate data for Schröcken (1981–2010)
Month	Jan	Feb	Mar	Apr	May	Jun	Jul	Aug	Sep	Oct	Nov	Dec	Year
Record high °C (°F)	14.0 (57.2)	15.5 (59.9)	18.0 (64.4)	21.0 (69.8)	27.5 (81.5)	30.0 (86.0)	31.5 (88.7)	29.6 (85.3)	27.5 (81.5)	24.4 (75.9)	20.0 (68.0)	20.0 (68.0)	31.5 (88.7)
Mean daily maximum °C (°F)	2.5 (36.5)	2.8 (37.0)	5.5 (41.9)	9.1 (48.4)	14.4 (57.9)	17.3 (63.1)	19.6 (67.3)	19.1 (66.4)	15.7 (60.3)	12.2 (54.0)	6.1 (43.0)	2.9 (37.2)	10.6 (51.1)
Daily mean °C (°F)	−2.1 (28.2)	−2.0 (28.4)	0.6 (33.1)	4.1 (39.4)	9.2 (48.6)	12.2 (54.0)	14.4 (57.9)	13.8 (56.8)	10.4 (50.7)	7.1 (44.8)	1.6 (34.9)	−1.1 (30.0)	5.7 (42.3)
Mean daily minimum °C (°F)	−5.4 (22.3)	−5.4 (22.3)	−2.7 (27.1)	0.7 (33.3)	5.2 (41.4)	8.0 (46.4)	10.4 (50.7)	10.1 (50.2)	7.1 (44.8)	3.9 (39.0)	−1.3 (29.7)	−4.1 (24.6)	2.2 (36.0)
Record low °C (°F)	−26.5 (−15.7)	−24.0 (−11.2)	−18.0 (−0.4)	−11.3 (11.7)	−4.5 (23.9)	−2.0 (28.4)	−0.2 (31.6)	0.0 (32.0)	−1.5 (29.3)	−10.0 (14.0)	−17.0 (1.4)	−21.0 (−5.8)	−26.5 (−15.7)
Average precipitation mm (inches)	162 (6.4)	156 (6.1)	192 (7.6)	140 (5.5)	179 (7.0)	229 (9.0)	268 (10.6)	256 (10.1)	184 (7.2)	130 (5.1)	157 (6.2)	171 (6.7)	2,224 (87.6)
Average relative humidity (%) (at 14:00)	60.4	59.1	57.2	52.6	53.2	58.2	57.6	60.2	60.6	60.4	65.5	66.2	59.3
Source: Central Institute for Meteorology and Geodynamics

Climate data for Schröcken (1971–2000)
Month	Jan	Feb	Mar	Apr	May	Jun	Jul	Aug	Sep	Oct	Nov	Dec	Year
Record high °C (°F)	14.0 (57.2)	15.5 (59.9)	18.0 (64.4)	23.0 (73.4)	26.0 (78.8)	28.0 (82.4)	31.5 (88.7)	29.5 (85.1)	29.2 (84.6)	23.0 (73.4)	20.0 (68.0)	18.5 (65.3)	31.5 (88.7)
Mean daily maximum °C (°F)	2.6 (36.7)	3.0 (37.4)	5.3 (41.5)	7.9 (46.2)	13.6 (56.5)	16.4 (61.5)	18.8 (65.8)	18.8 (65.8)	15.6 (60.1)	11.6 (52.9)	5.7 (42.3)	3.3 (37.9)	10.2 (50.4)
Daily mean °C (°F)	−1.8 (28.8)	−1.7 (28.9)	0.5 (32.9)	3.2 (37.8)	8.4 (47.1)	11.2 (52.2)	13.5 (56.3)	13.4 (56.1)	10.2 (50.4)	6.6 (43.9)	1.3 (34.3)	−0.7 (30.7)	5.3 (41.5)
Mean daily minimum °C (°F)	−5.2 (22.6)	−5.0 (23.0)	−2.8 (27.0)	−0.1 (31.8)	4.6 (40.3)	7.2 (45.0)	9.6 (49.3)	9.7 (49.5)	6.8 (44.2)	3.5 (38.3)	−1.8 (28.8)	−4.0 (24.8)	1.9 (35.4)
Record low °C (°F)	−26.5 (−15.7)	−24.0 (−11.2)	−23.5 (−10.3)	−11.5 (11.3)	−7.8 (18.0)	−1.0 (30.2)	−0.2 (31.6)	0.0 (32.0)	−1.5 (29.3)	−11.0 (12.2)	−17.0 (1.4)	−21.6 (−6.9)	−26.5 (−15.7)
Average precipitation mm (inches)	174.4 (6.87)	161.8 (6.37)	180.0 (7.09)	162.3 (6.39)	172.4 (6.79)	252.1 (9.93)	286.5 (11.28)	233.7 (9.20)	183.0 (7.20)	138.3 (5.44)	178.5 (7.03)	185.8 (7.31)	2,308.8 (90.90)
Average snowfall cm (inches)	170.7 (67.2)	156.8 (61.7)	179.8 (70.8)	91.5 (36.0)	20.5 (8.1)	4.3 (1.7)	0.0 (0.0)	0.5 (0.2)	2.4 (0.9)	16.9 (6.7)	97.5 (38.4)	175.1 (68.9)	916.0 (360.6)
Average precipitation days (≥ 1.0 mm)	12.7	11.7	14.3	14.7	16.2	18.0	17.2	16.3	12.8	11.5	12.8	13.3	171.5
Average relative humidity (%) (at 14:00)	59.9	57.6	56.0	53.4	52.1	57.6	56.9	58.6	58.7	58.9	65.8	63.4	58.2
Source: Central Institute for Meteorology and Geodynamics

== See also ==
- Horizon Field
