= Puppet =

Manually-manipulated small figure

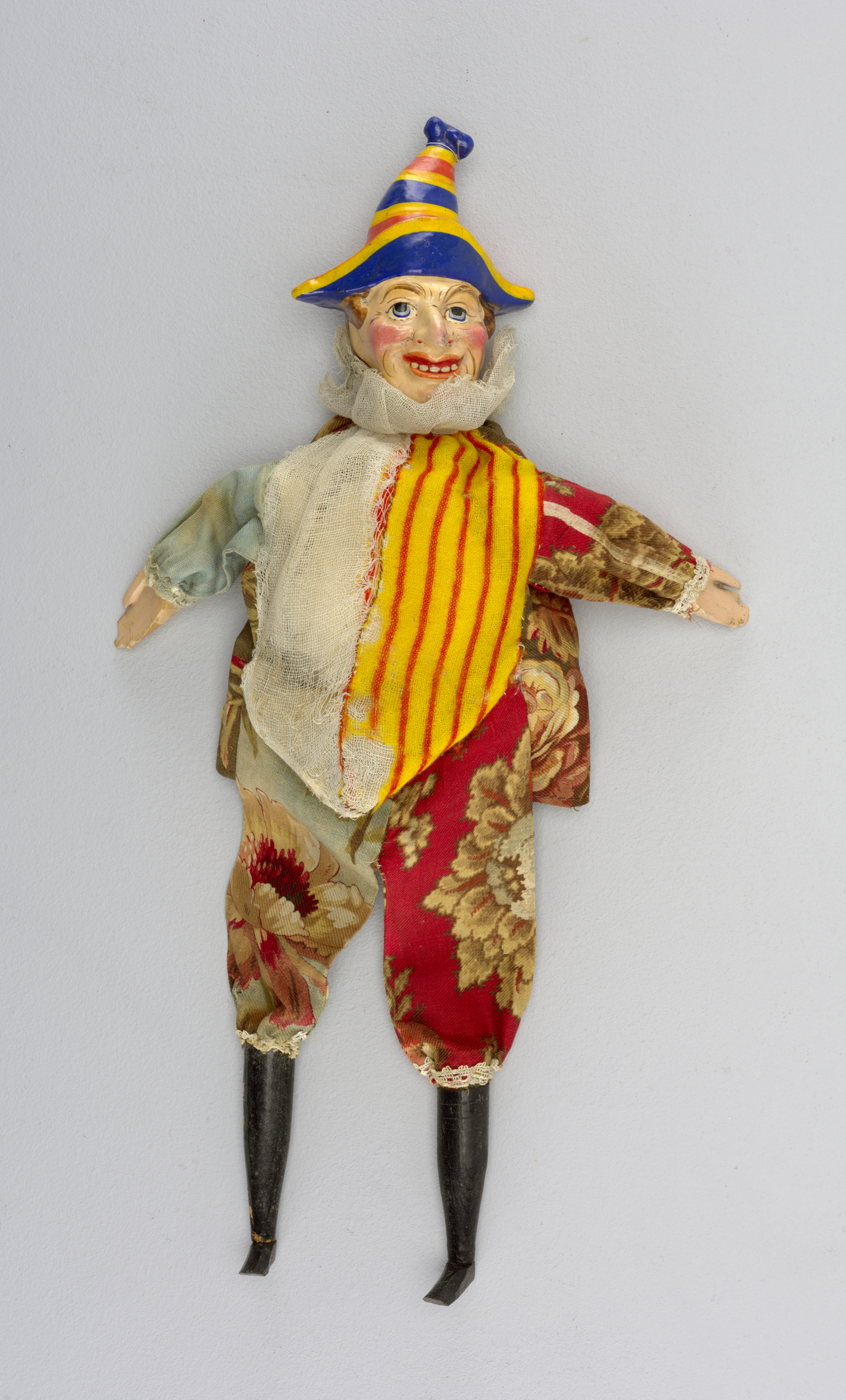
A puppet, from Punch and Judy show, England, late 19th century

A puppet is an object, often resembling a human, animal or mythical figure, that is animated or manipulated by a person called a puppeteer. Puppetry is an ancient form of theatre which dates back to the 5th century BC in ancient Greece.

There are many different varieties of puppets, and they are made from a wide range of materials, depending on their form and intended use. They range from very simple in construction and operation to very complex. The puppeteer uses movements of their hands, arms, or control devices such as rods or strings to move the body, head, limbs, and in some cases the mouth and eyes of the puppet. The puppeteer often speaks in the voice of the character of the puppet, and then synchronizes the movements of the puppet's mouth with this spoken part. The actions, gestures and spoken parts acted out by the puppeteer with the puppet are typically used in storytelling.

A simple type of puppet is the finger puppet, which is a tiny puppet that fits onto a single finger. A hand puppet is controlled using one hand that occupies the interior of the puppet and moves the puppet around. The simplest type is a sock puppet, which is formed and operated by inserting one's hand inside a closed sock-like cloth sleeve, with the opening and closing of the hand creating the movement of the puppet's mouth. A "rod-hand puppet" is a more complex hand puppet in which the puppeteer uses their second hand to manipulate rods that control the puppet's arms or other appendages. A "live-hand puppet" is a hand puppet that is larger and requires two puppeteers to operate, as in addition to the primary puppeteer's hand operating the head and mouth, one of each puppeteers' hands operates each of the puppet's hands.

A marionette is a much more complicated type of puppet that is suspended and controlled by a number of strings connected to the head, back and limbs, plus sometimes a central rod attached to a control bar held from above by the puppeteer.

A shadow puppet is a cut-out figure held between a source of light and a screen on which the image is projected. Bunraku puppets are a type of Japanese wood-carved puppet. A ventriloquist's dummy is a puppet, often human-shaped, operated by a ventriloquist performer's hand; the performer produces the puppet's voice with little or no movement of her mouth, which creates the illusion that the puppet is alive. Carnival puppets are large puppets, typically bigger than a human, designed to be part of a large spectacle or parade.

== Origins ==
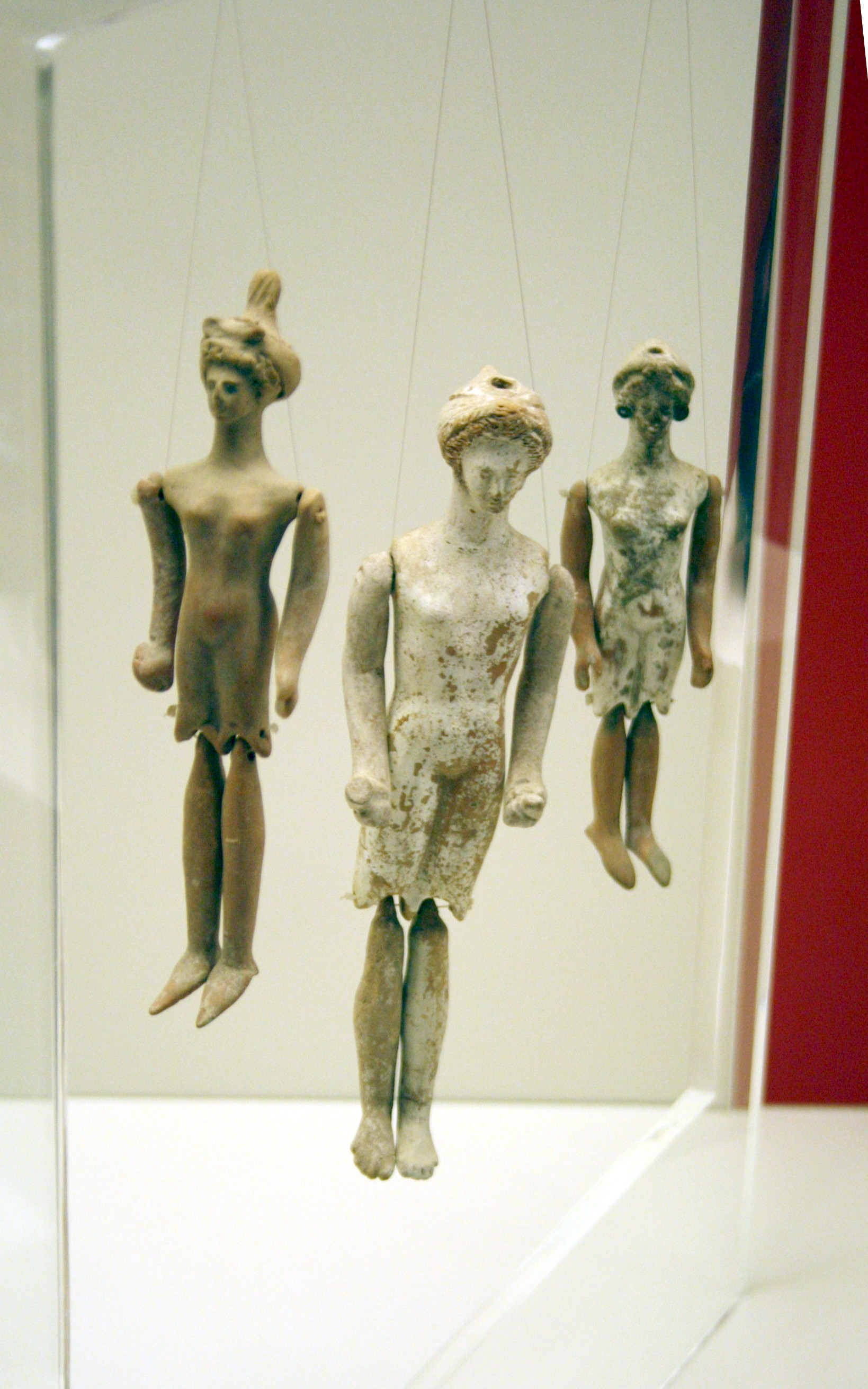
Ancient Greek terracotta puppet dolls, 5th/4th century BC, National Archaeological Museum, Athens

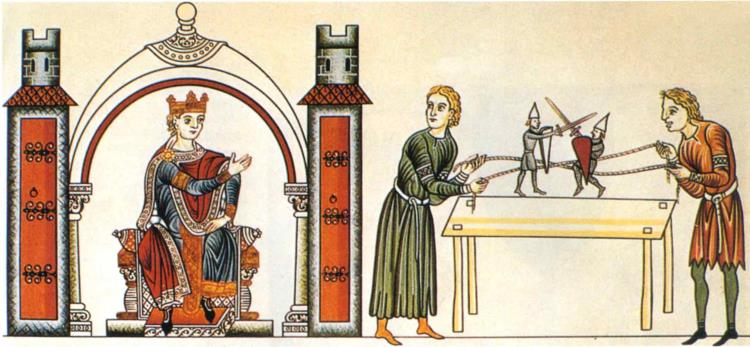
Medieval knight puppets do battle in the Hortus deliciarum. Each puppet is manipulated by both puppeteers.

Puppetry was practiced in Ancient Greece, and the oldest written records of puppetry can be found in the works of Herodotus and Xenophon, dating from the 5th century BC. The Greek word translated as "puppet" is "νευρόσπαστος" (nevrospastos), which literally means "drawn by strings, string-pulling", from "νεῦρον" (nevron), meaning either "sinew, tendon, muscle, string", or "wire", and "σπάω" (spaō), meaning "draw, pull".

Aristotle (384–322 BC) discusses puppets in his work On the Motion of Animals.

The movements of animals may be compared with those of automatic puppets, which are set going on the occasion of a tiny movement; the levers are released, and strike the twisted strings against one another.

In India, puppetry was practiced from ancient times and is known by different names in different parts of the country. Excavation of clay dolls from Indus valley sites serve as an indication. The art of puppetry called Bommalattam is mentioned in Tamil literature Silappadikaram, which is written around 2nd century B.C.

== Types ==
Puppetry by its nature is a flexible and inventive medium and many puppet companies work with combinations of puppet forms and incorporate real objects into their performances. They might, for example, incorporate performing objects such as torn paper for snow, or a sign board with words as narrative devices within a production. The following are, alphabetically, the basic and conventional forms of puppet:

=== Black light puppet ===
A black light puppet

The black light puppet is a form of puppetry where the puppets are operated on a stage lit only with ultraviolet lighting, which hides the puppeteer and accentuates the colours of the puppets, which are normally designed using colours that respond to UV light by glowing brightly. The puppeteers perform dressed in black against a black background, with the background and puppeteer's costume normally made of black velvet. The puppeteers manipulate the puppets under the light, while they position themselves unseen against the black unlit background. Puppets of many sizes and types may be used. The original concept of this form of puppetry can be traced to Bunraku puppetry.

=== Bunraku puppet ===
Bunraku puppets are a type of wood-carved puppet originally made to stand out through torch illumination. Developed in Japan over a thousand years ago and formalised and combined with shamisen music at the end of the 16th century, the puppeteers dress to remain neutral against a black background, although their presence as a kind of 'shadow' figure adds a mysterious power to the puppet. Bunraku traditionally uses three puppeteers to operate a puppet that varies from 1/3 to 1/2 life size.

=== Cantastoria ===
Cantastoria is a form of visual storytelling in which a puppet, illustration, painting, or other visual medium is accompanied by rhythmical speech or song that describes or reenacts events to tell a story.

=== Carnival/Body Puppets ===
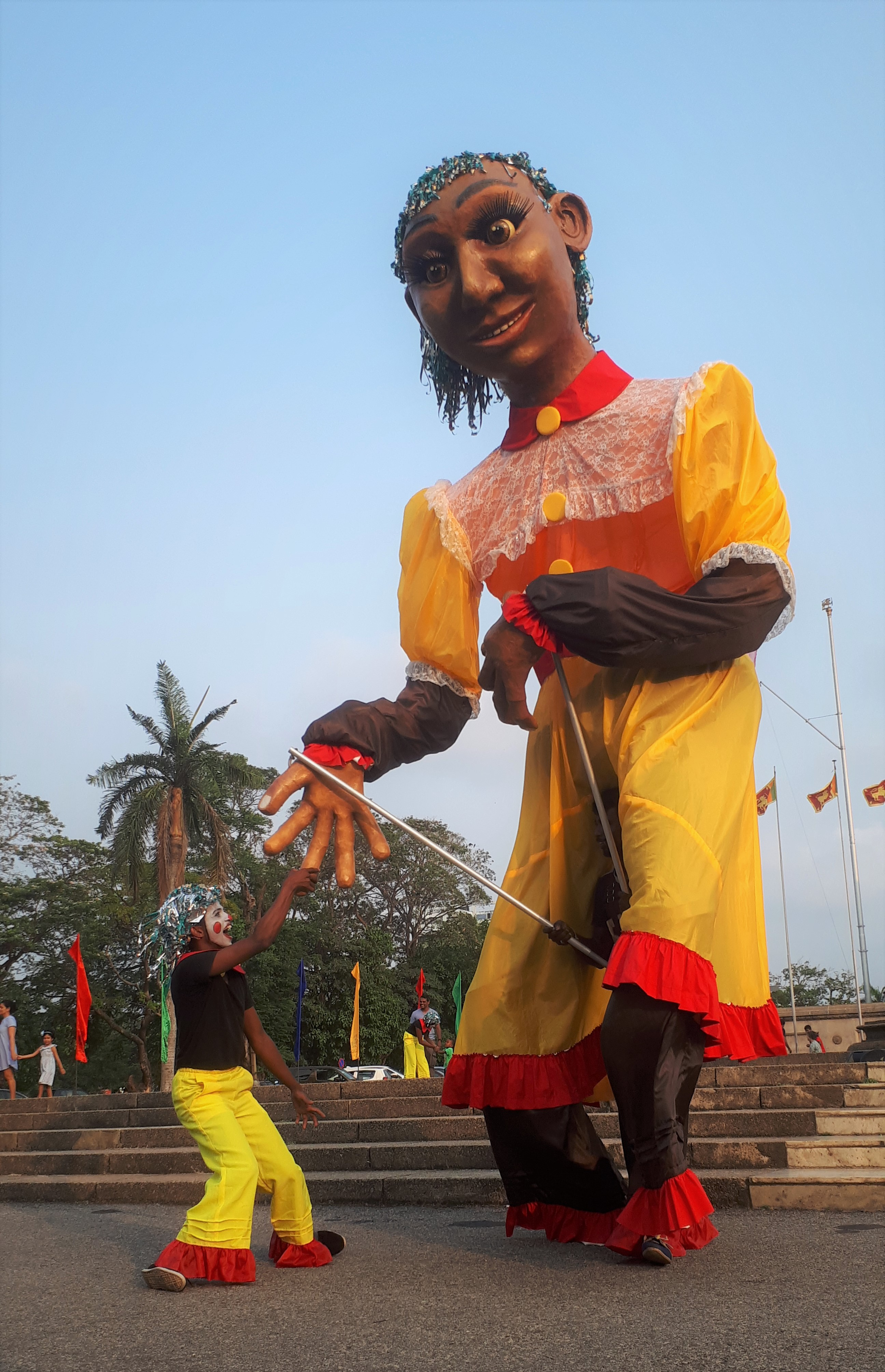
The Little Girl Giant Puppet in Sri Lanka was a novel initiative to educate on female empowerment.

Carnival puppets (also known as body puppets) are usually designed to be part of a large spectacle. These are often used in parades (such as the Mayday parade in Minneapolis, United States and The Cape Town Carnival in South Africa) and demonstrations, and are at least the size of a human and often much larger. One or more performers are required to move the body and limbs. In parades, the appearance and personality of the person inside is not relevant to the spectator. These puppets are particularly associated with large-scale entertainment, such as the nightly parades at various Disney complexes around the world. Similar puppets were designed by Julie Taymor for The Lion King.

The Jim Henson Company also has their version of these puppets called full-bodied puppets. The Sesame Street characters Big Bird and Mr. Snuffleupagus, as well as the titular character from Bear in the Big Blue House, are popular examples of this type of puppet (Snuffleupagus, in particular, requires two puppeteers; one in the front of the puppet, and one in the back).

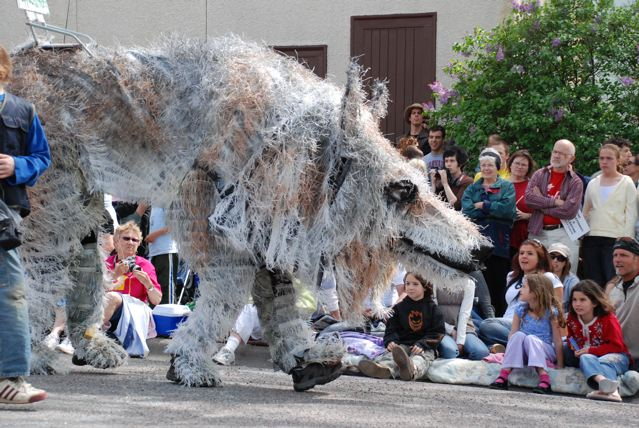
Carnival Puppet featuring two puppeteers - Minneapolis, USA: May Day Parade

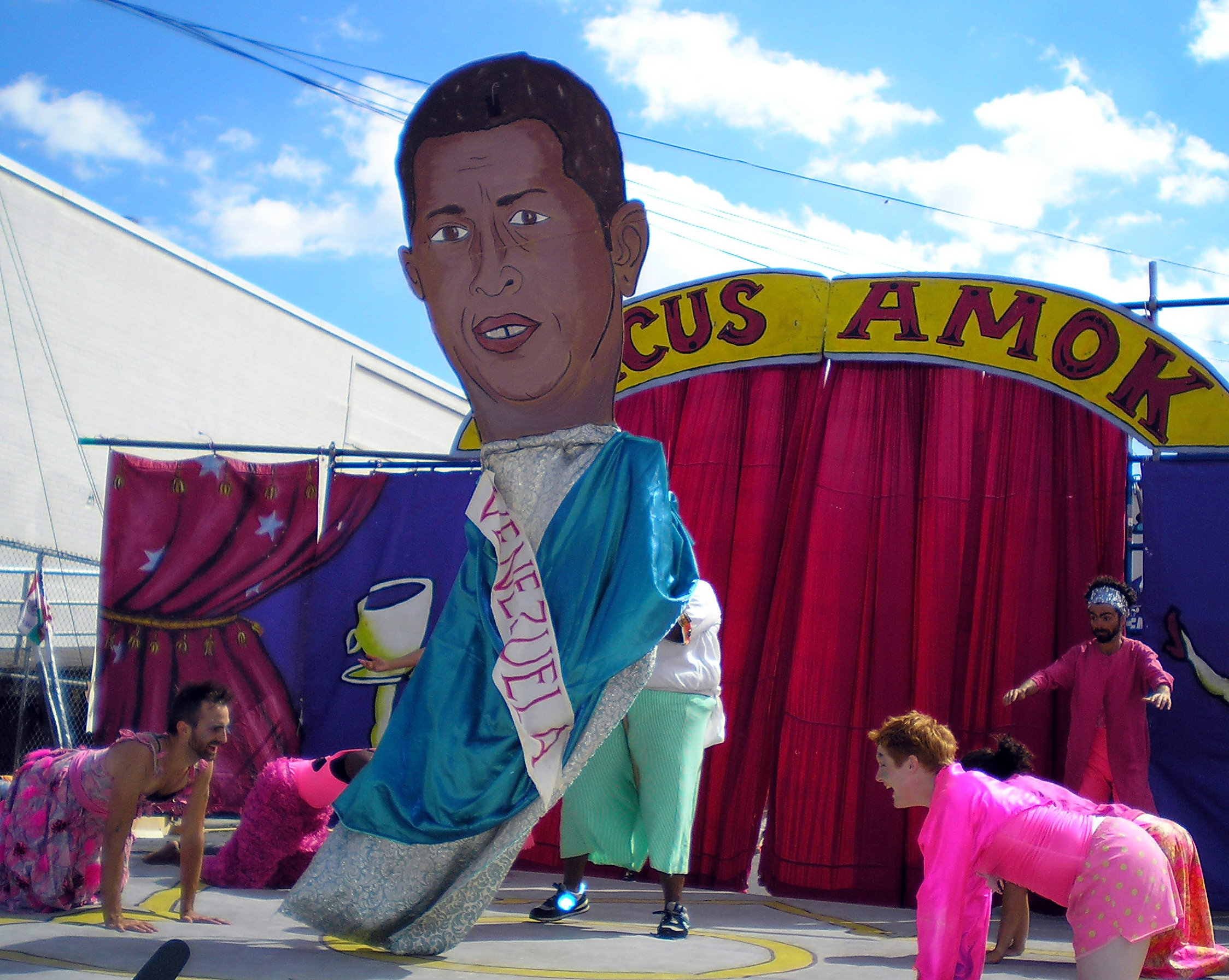
Venezuelan President Hugo Chávez - human carnival puppet

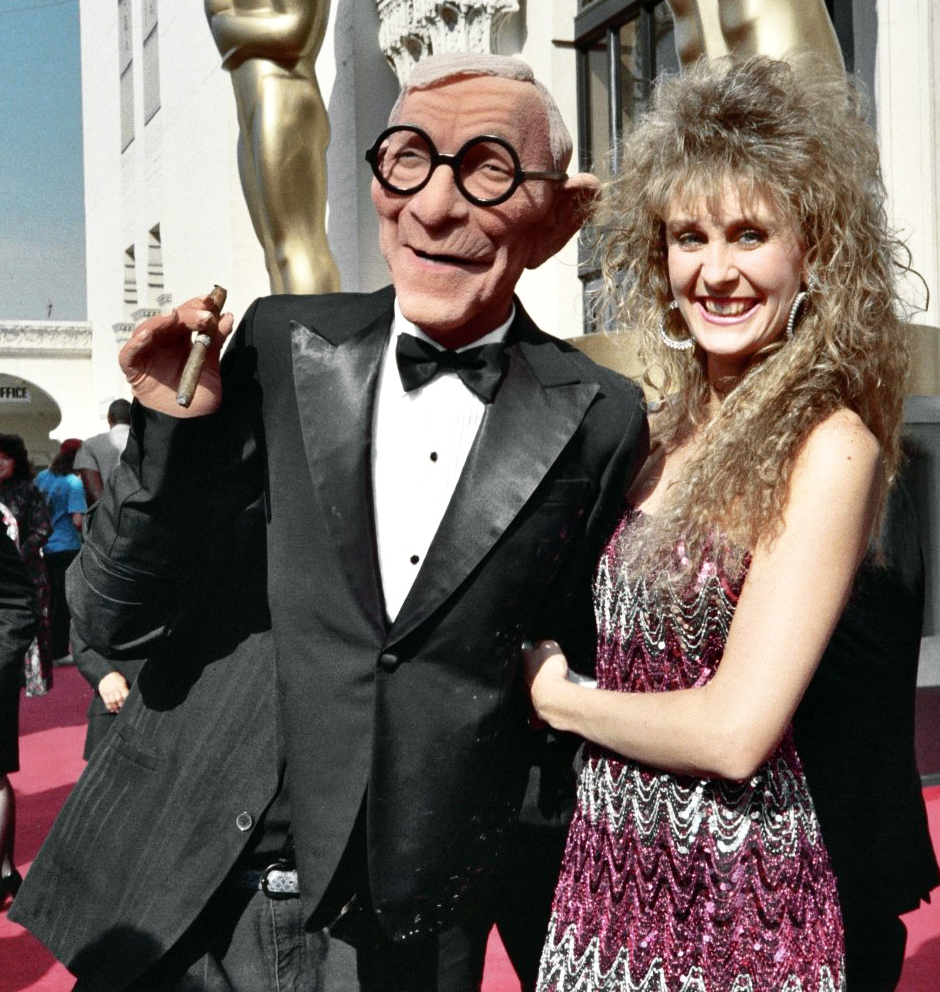
Woman carrying body puppet of George Burns at 1988 Academy Awards

The Little Girl Giant Puppet is an initiative by the MJF Charitable Foundation to promote Puppetry and to spread the message of female empowerment in Sri Lanka. This giant puppet measured 14 ft and was built under the direction of Swedish artist Felix Widen Norgren (Director, Compania Pirata) in collaboration with Power of Play PVT LTD, Sri Lanka.

=== Finger puppet ===
The finger puppet is a simple puppet variant which fits onto a single finger. Finger puppets normally have no moving parts, and consist primarily of a hollow cylinder shape to cover the finger. Finger puppets are often decorated with eyes and mouths made out of fabric or other materials. This form of puppet has limited application and is used mainly in pre-schools or kindergartens for storytelling with young children.

Finger puppets

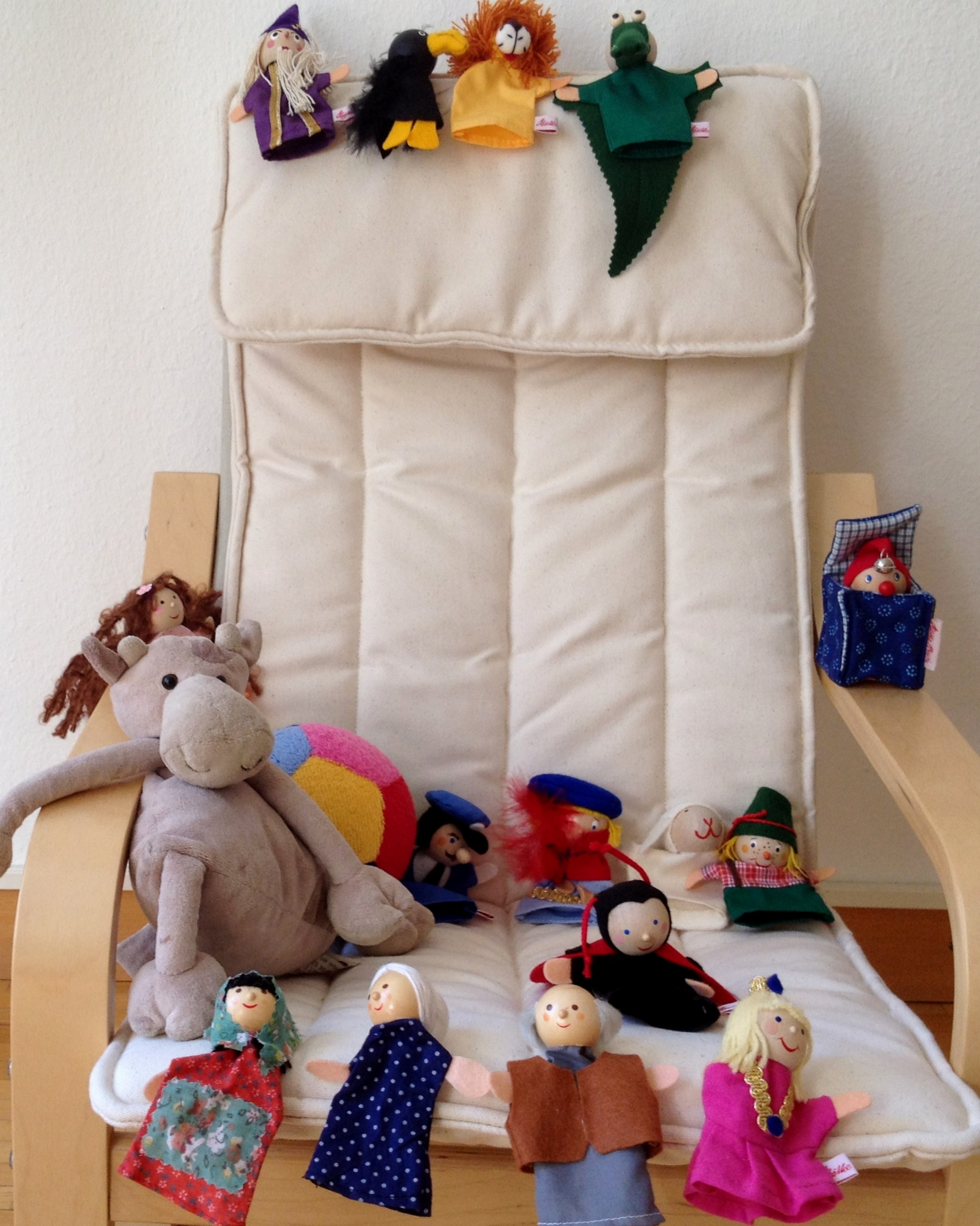
Finger puppets

=== Hand puppet or glove puppet ===
A hand puppet (or glove puppet) is a puppet controlled by one hand, which occupies the interior of the puppet. The Punch and Judy puppets are familiar examples of hand puppets. Larger varieties of hand puppets place the puppeteer's hand in just the puppet's head, controlling the mouth and head, and the puppet's body then hangs over the entire arm. Other parts of the puppet (mainly arms) are usually not much larger than the hand itself. Often the mouth can also open and close, and special variants exist with eyelids that can be manipulated. A sock puppet is a particularly simple type of hand puppet made from a sock.

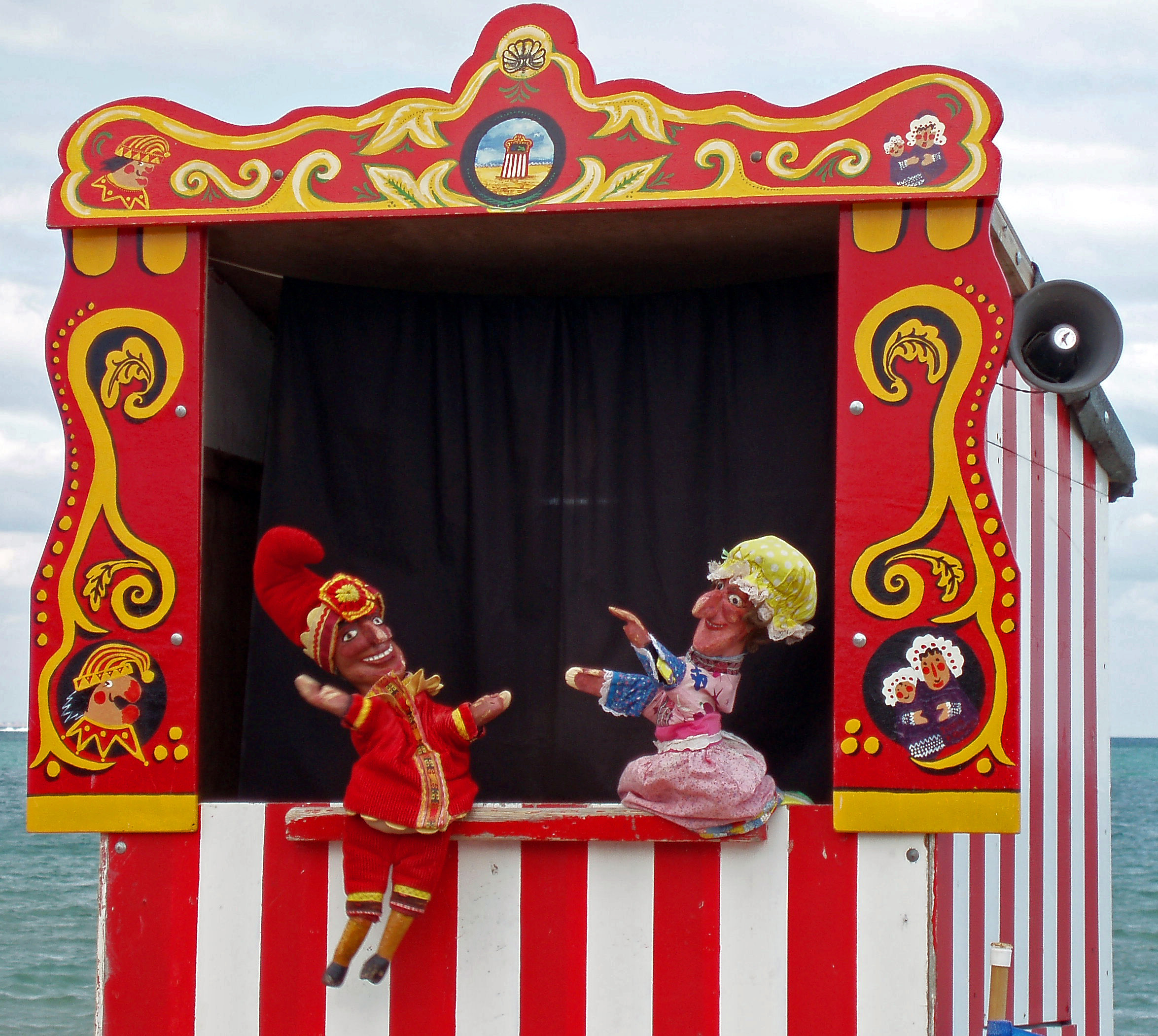
British traditional hand or glove puppets, Punch and Judy

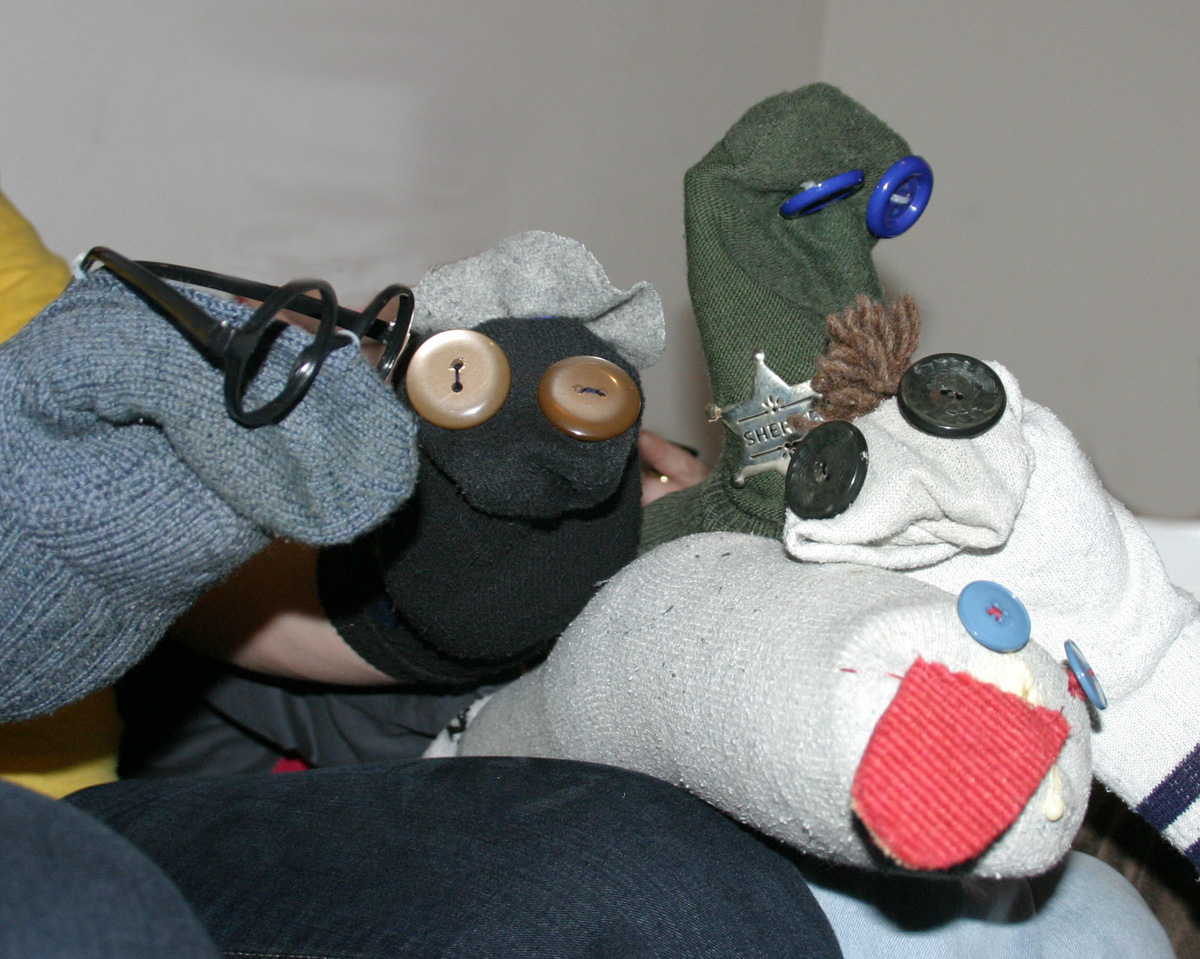
Simple sock puppets

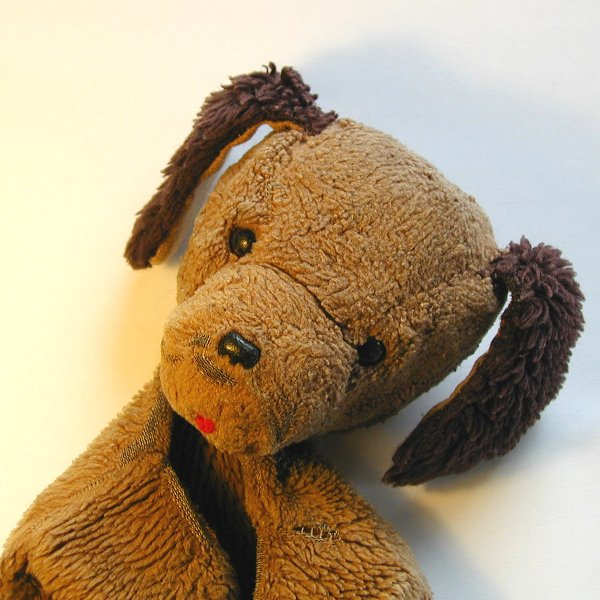
Hand or glove puppet dog

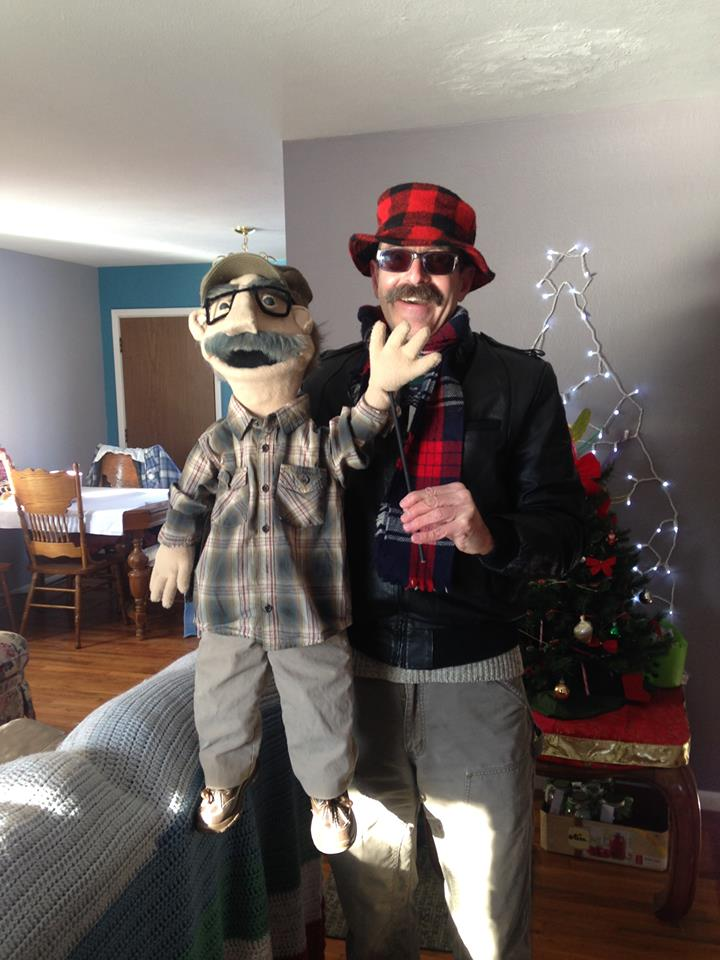
A bespoke hand puppet and Christmas gift

=== Human-arm puppet ===
Also called a "two-man puppet" or a "live-hand puppet", the human-arm puppet is similar to a hand puppet but is larger and requires two puppeteers. One puppeteer places their dominant hand inside the puppet's head and operates the puppet's head and mouth, while putting their non-dominant hand into a glove and special sleeve attached to the puppet to operate one of the arms. The second puppeteer puts their hand into another glove/sleeve attached to the puppet in order to operate the other arm. This way, the puppet can perform hand gestures and interact with objects with ease. This is a form of glove or hand puppetry and rod puppetry. Many puppeteers, particularly those for Jim Henson's Muppets, get their start assisting on a human-arm puppet; this is often known as "right-handing".

Some of Henson's Muppets, such as the Muppet character Fozzie Bear and the Sesame Street characters Ernie and Count von Count, are live-hand puppets, as are Yoda and ALF. A variation of this puppet, called a "sack-body" puppet, is built with the puppet's arms directly connected to its base. Popular examples include the Sesame Street characters Cookie Monster and Oscar the Grouch, and the Muppet character Rowlf the Dog. The Swedish Chef, another Muppet character, is operated in a unique way; both of his hands are actual human hands, supplied by the second performer. The technique of the main puppeteer performing a character's head with an assistant performing both arms is also used for Rowlf playing the piano.

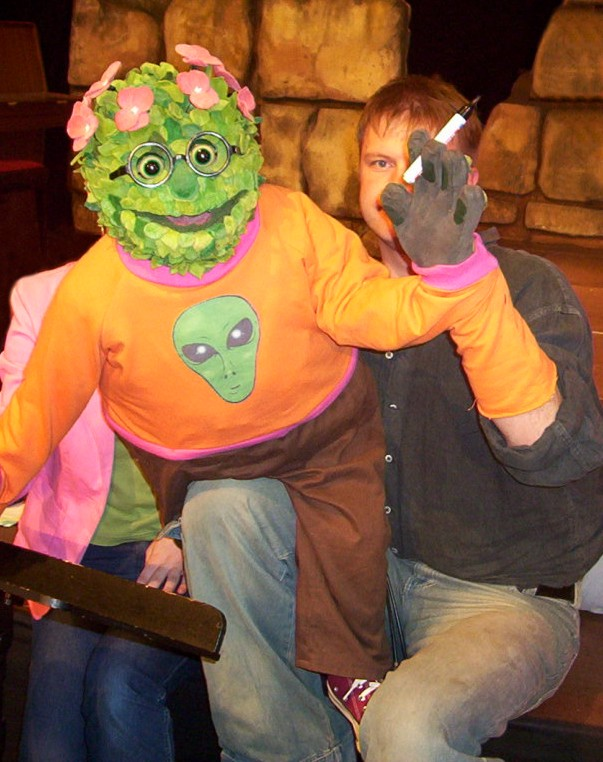
"Briegel der Busch" puppet and puppeteer Jan Mixsa, autographing at "Erstes Fantreffen von Bernd das Brot"

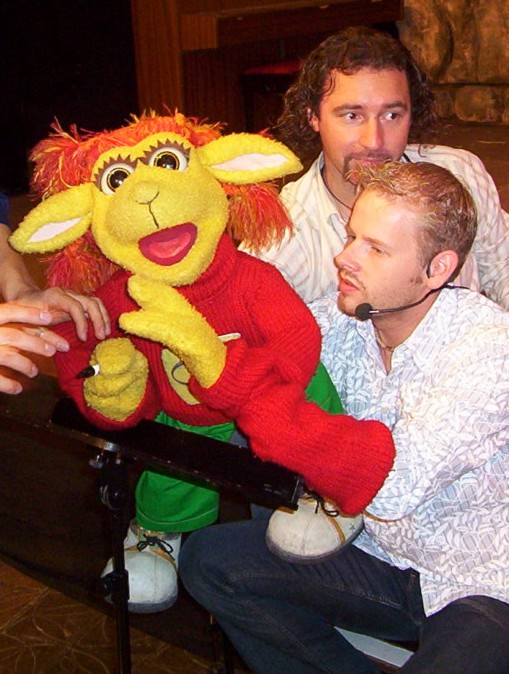
"Chili das Schaf" puppet and creators Tommy Krappweis and Erik Haffner, taken at "Erstes Fantreffen von Bernd das Brot"

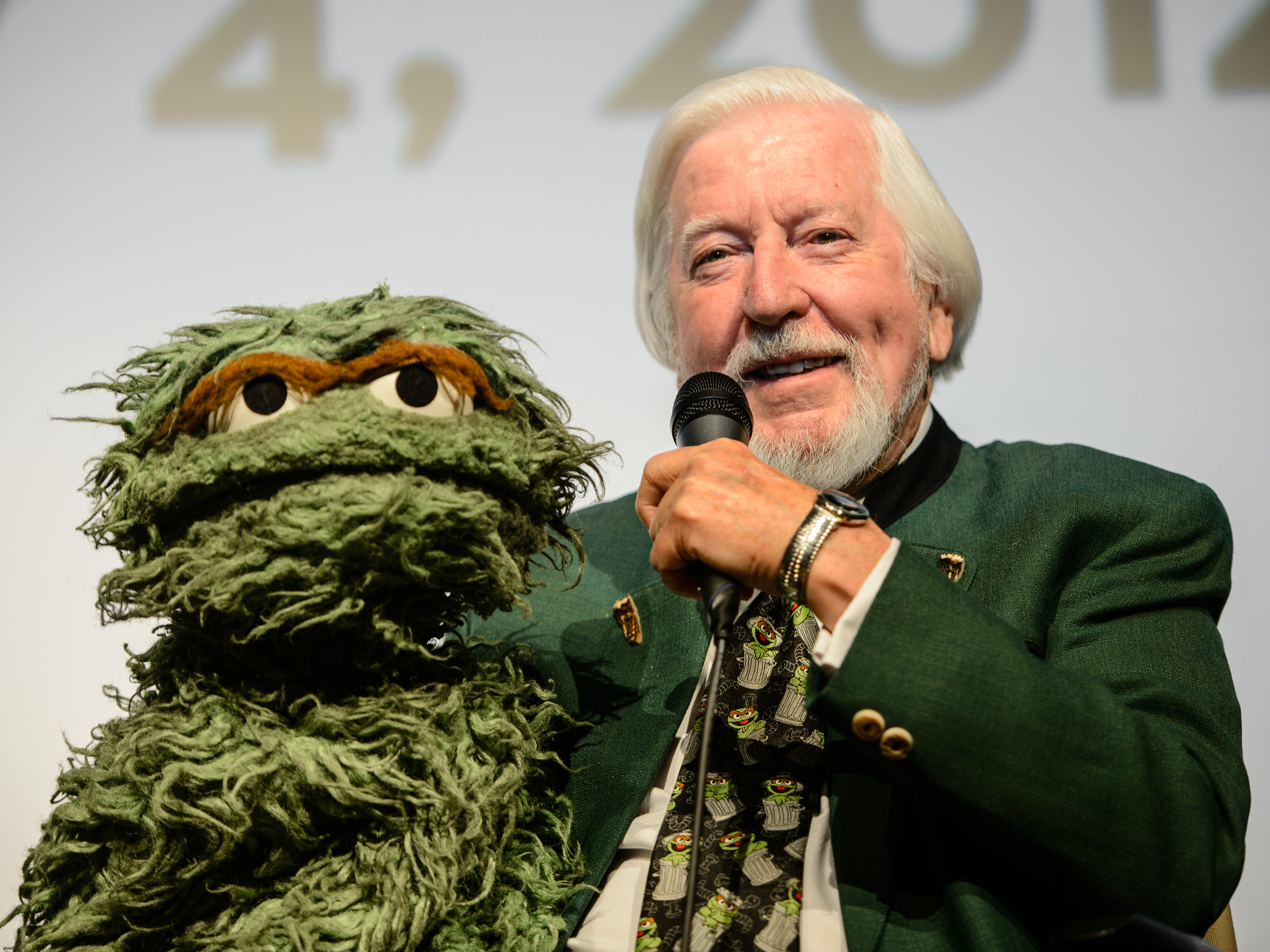
Oscar the Grouch and puppeteer Caroll Spinney

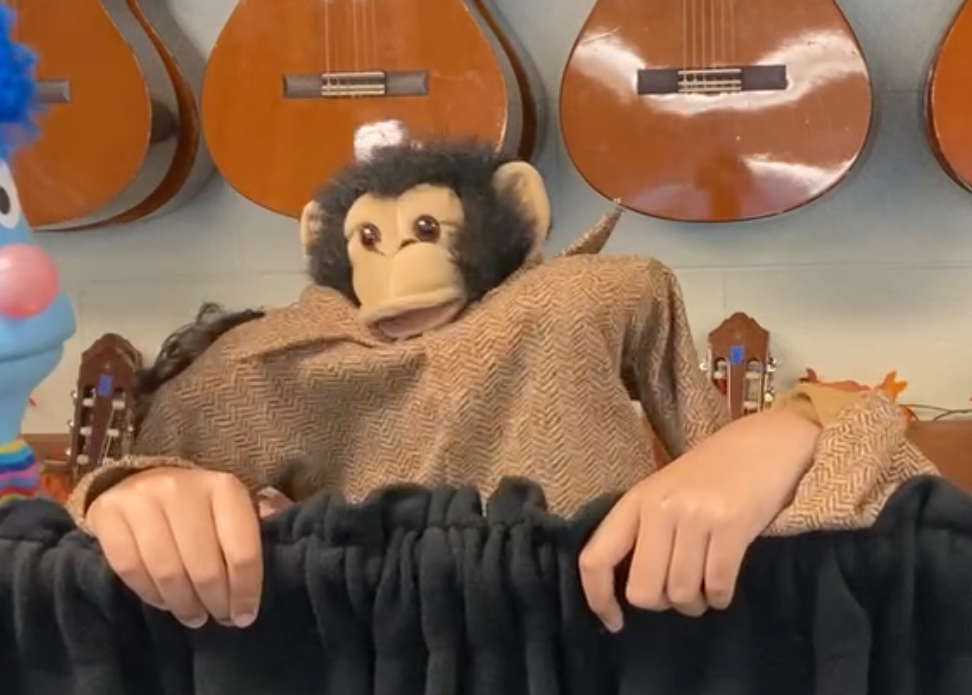
A 2-puppeteer-operated hand puppet of a Chimpanzee

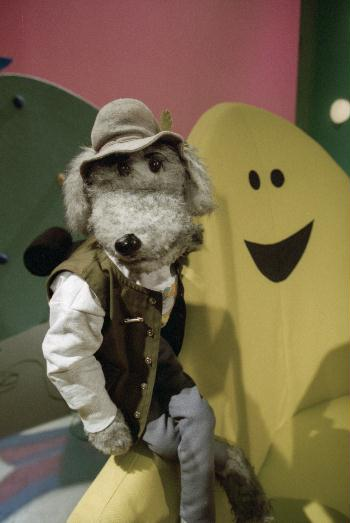
Ransu Karvakuono from the Finnish children's TV show Pikku Kakkonen

=== Light curtain puppet ===
Light curtain puppet presentations use light to highlight small portions of a performance area, allowing the puppet to be seen while the manipulators remain invisible. The puppets stand on a stage divided into an unlit background and a well-lit foreground, meeting to form a "curtain" of light. The puppeteer dresses in black and remains hidden in the unlit background of the stage while the puppet is held across the light curtain in the lit foreground of the stage. "Light curtain puppet" is an umbrella term, and any puppet which is extended into a well-lit area where its handler remains separated from the puppet by a division of light may be called a light curtain puppet.

=== Marionette ===
Marionettes, or "string puppets", are suspended and controlled by a number of strings, plus sometimes a central rod attached to a control bar held from above by the puppeteer. The control bar can be either horizontal or vertical. Basic strings for operation are usually attached to the head, back, hands (to control the arms) and just above the knee (to control the legs). This form of puppetry is complex and sophisticated to operate, requiring greater manipulative control than a finger, glove or rod puppet. The puppet play performed by the Von Trapp children with Maria in The Sound of Music is a marionette show.

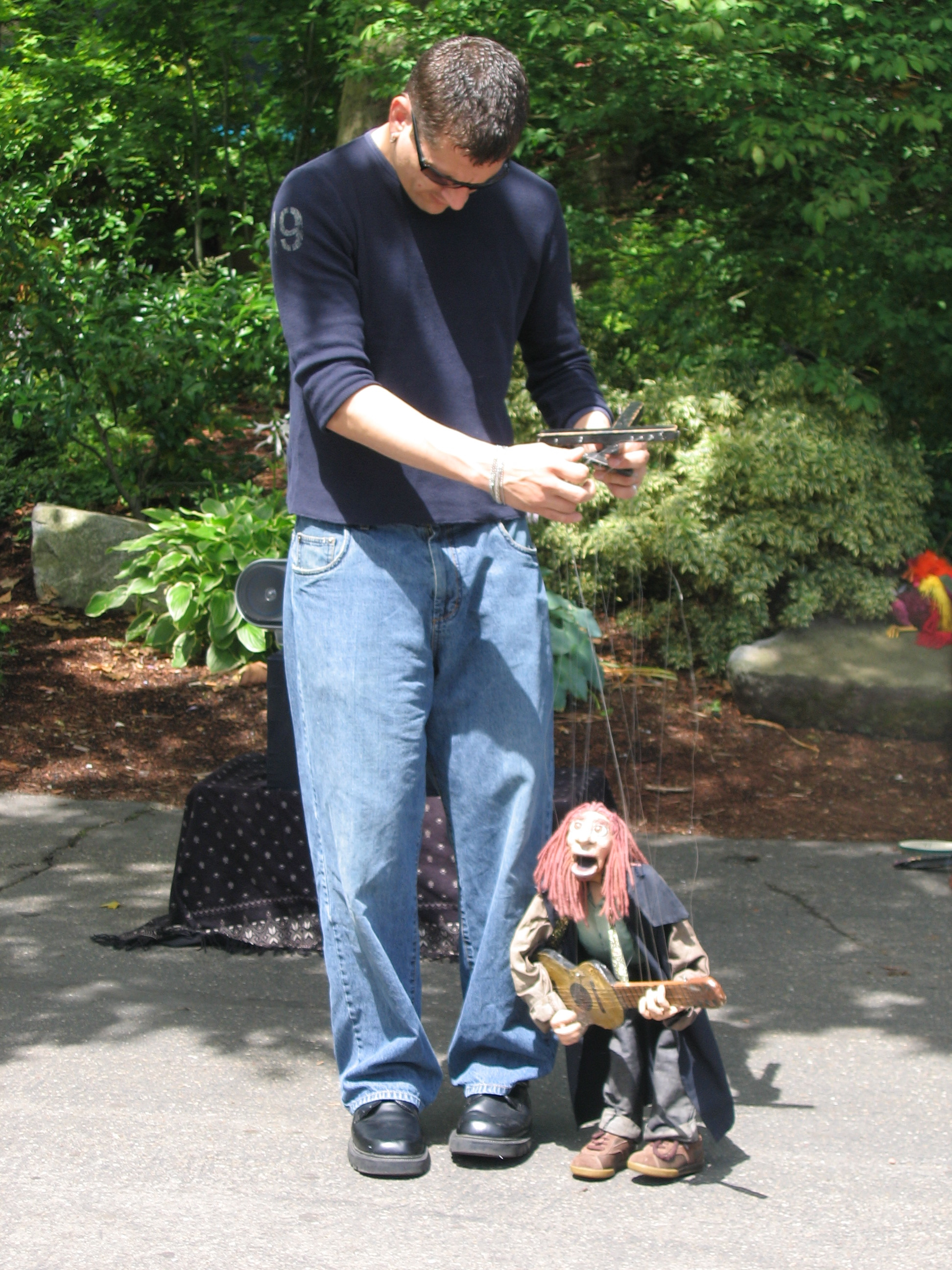
A puppeteer manipulating a marionette

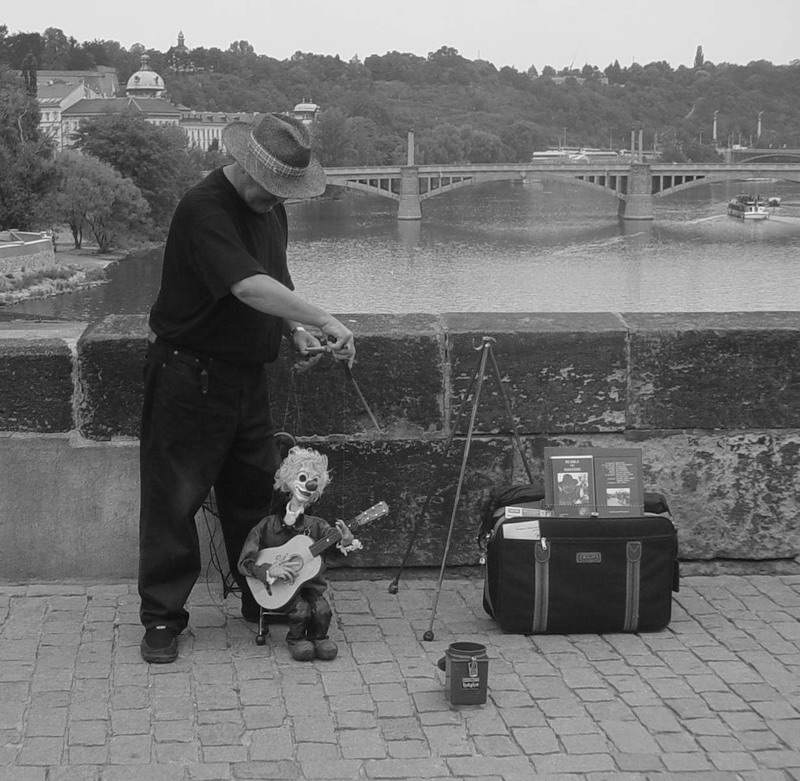
A puppeteer manipulating a marionette in Prague, Czech Republic

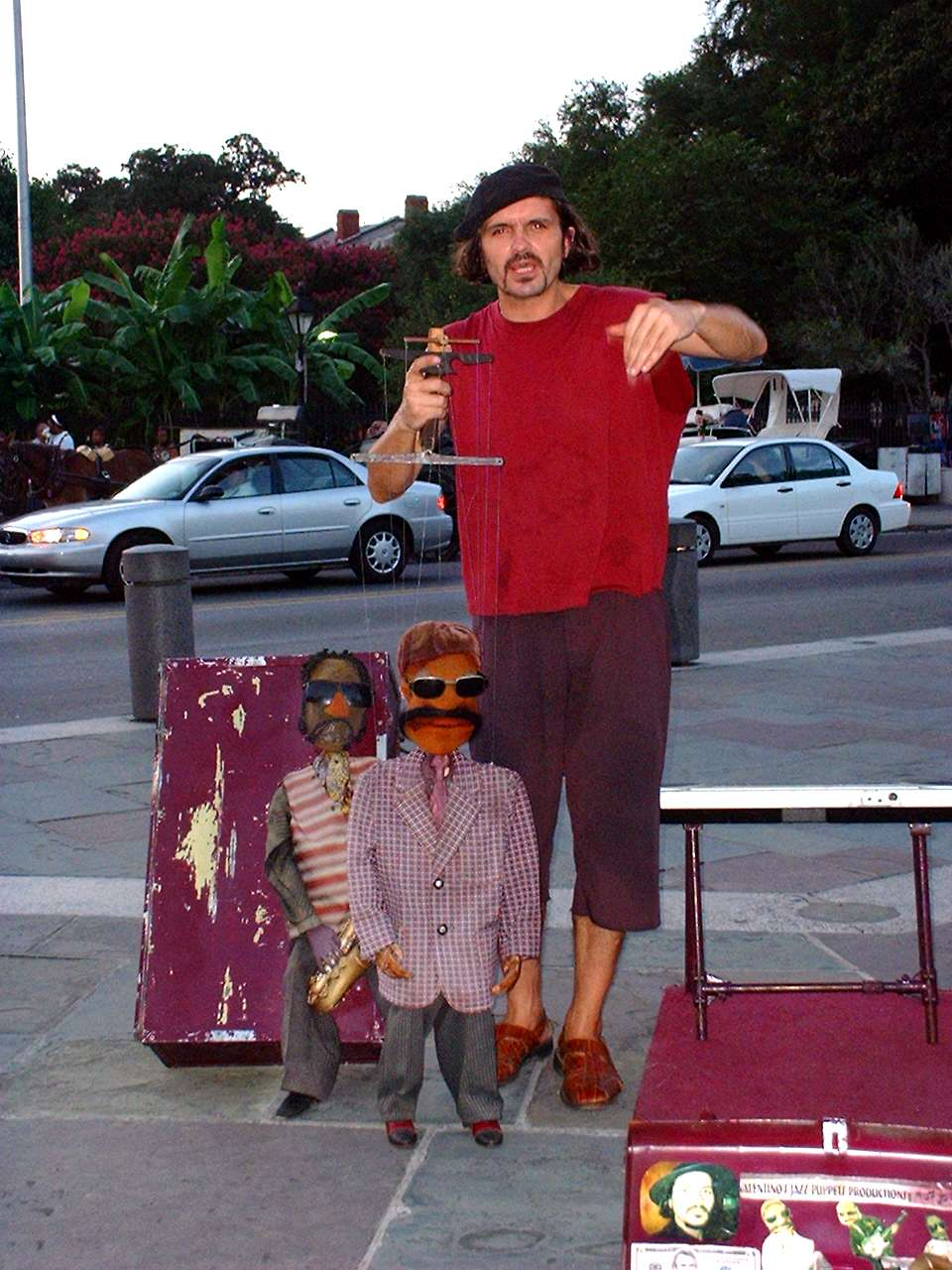
Puppeteer performing in New Orleans, Louisiana

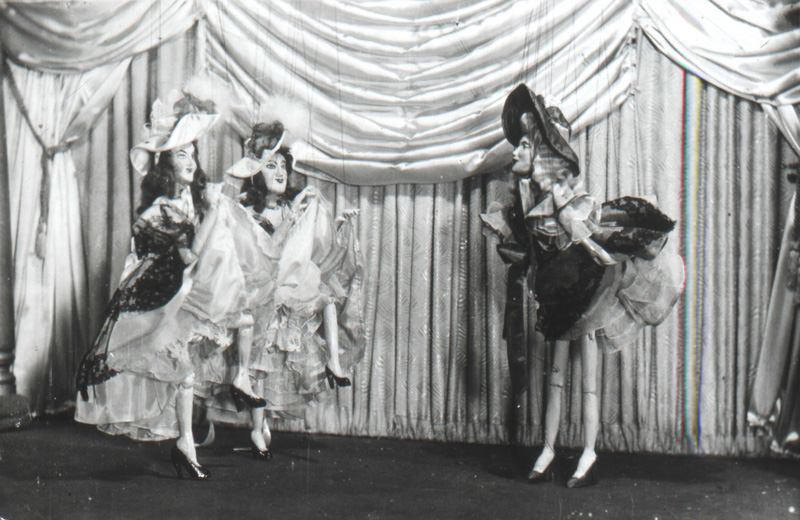
"The Giglet Sisters" posed on puppet theatre stage

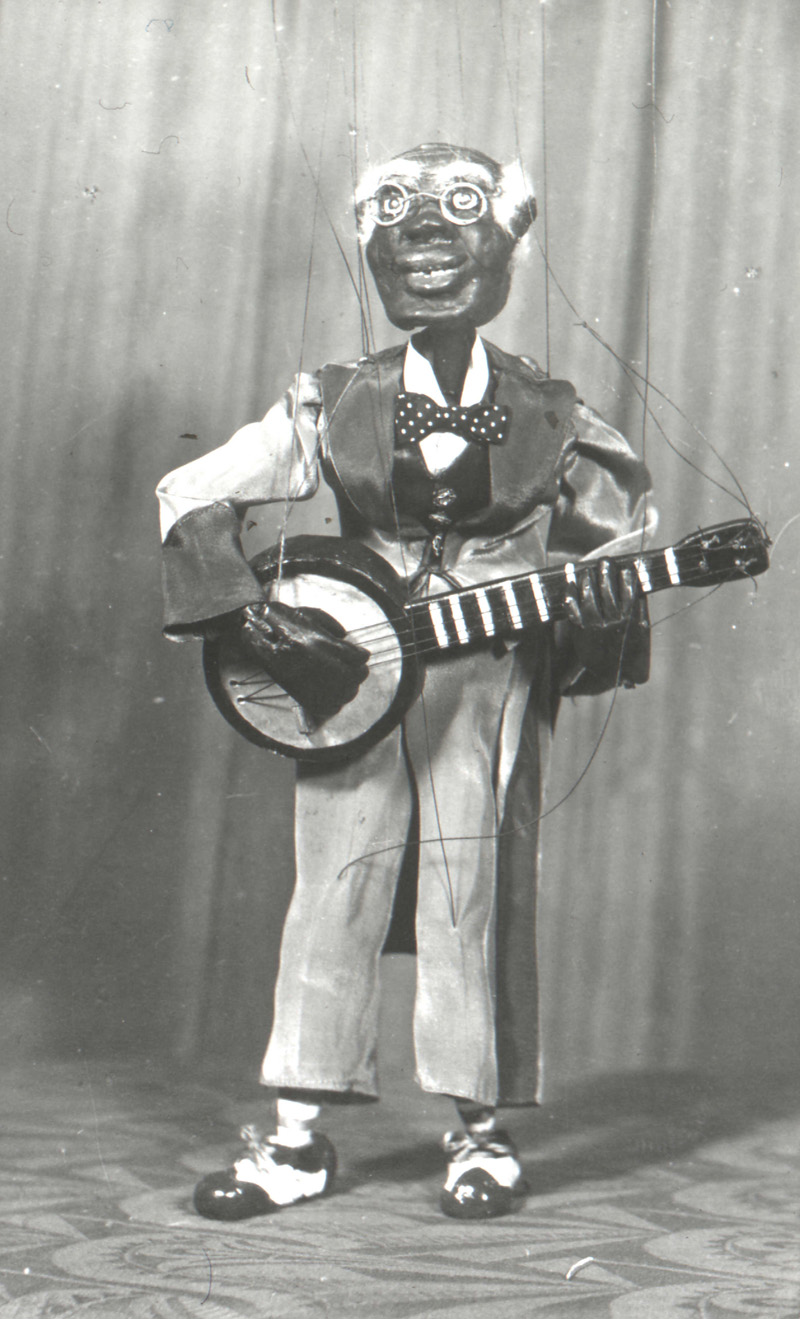
"Uncle Rastus" an elderly man playing a banjo

Marionettes on stage in Japan, 2008

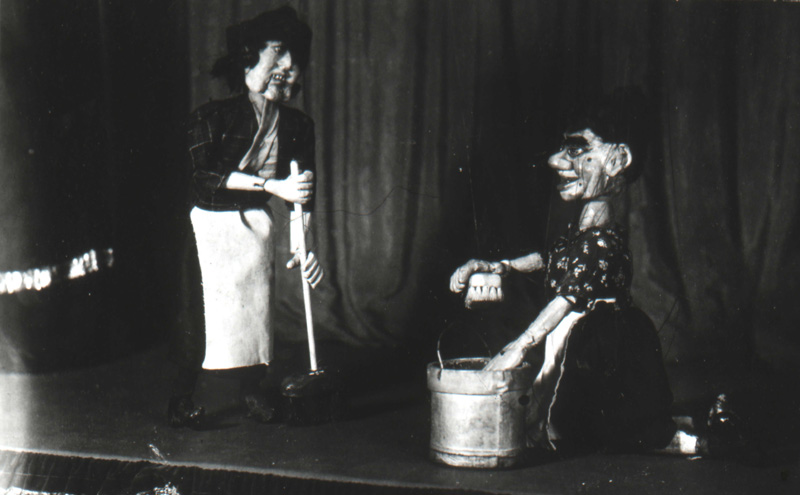
"Mrs Garbage" and "Mrs Guppy", charwomen

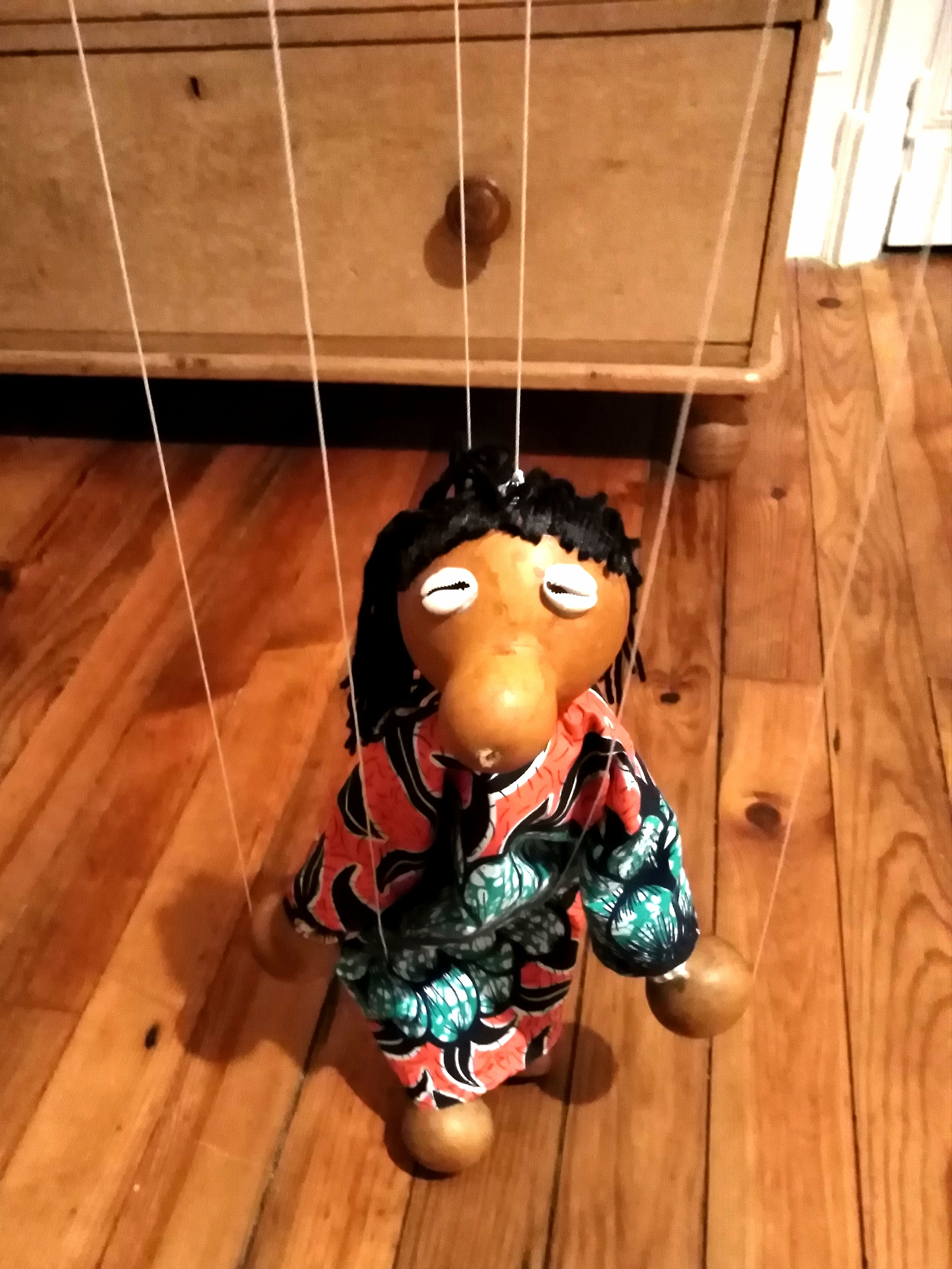
Calabash puppet

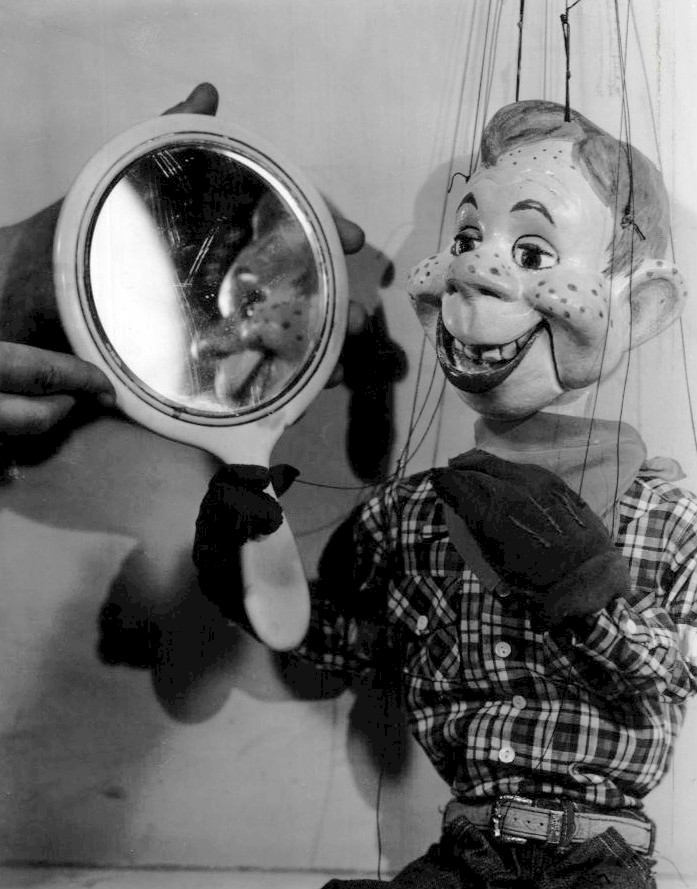
Howdy Doody a famous marionette character

Prominent marionette theaters operating today include: Salzberg Marionette Theater, Bob Baker Marionette Theater, Center for Puppetry Arts, Melchior Marionette Theater, the Swedish Cottage Marionette Theatre in Central Park, New York, and Le Theatre de Marionette.

=== Marotte ===
The marotte is a simplified rod puppet that is just a head and/or body on a stick. It was used by jesters in renaissance times. In a marotte à main prenante, the puppeteer's other arm emerges from the body (which is just a cloth drape) to act as the puppet's arm. Some marottes have a small string running through the stick attached to a handle at the bottom. When the handle is squeezed, the mouth opens.

=== Motekar ===
Motekar or wayang motekar is a kind of shadow puppet theater known in Sundanese, Javanese, and Indonesian as 'wayang (kulit)', that is, (leather) shadow puppet. While most shadow puppets cast black silhouettes from behind a screen, motekar shadow puppets can be in full color. They use plastic materials, transparent dyes, a special light system, and a special type of screen to make this happen. Motekar puppet shows can be performed by one or several puppeteers and usually feature music, singing, and a series of dances.

=== Object puppet ===
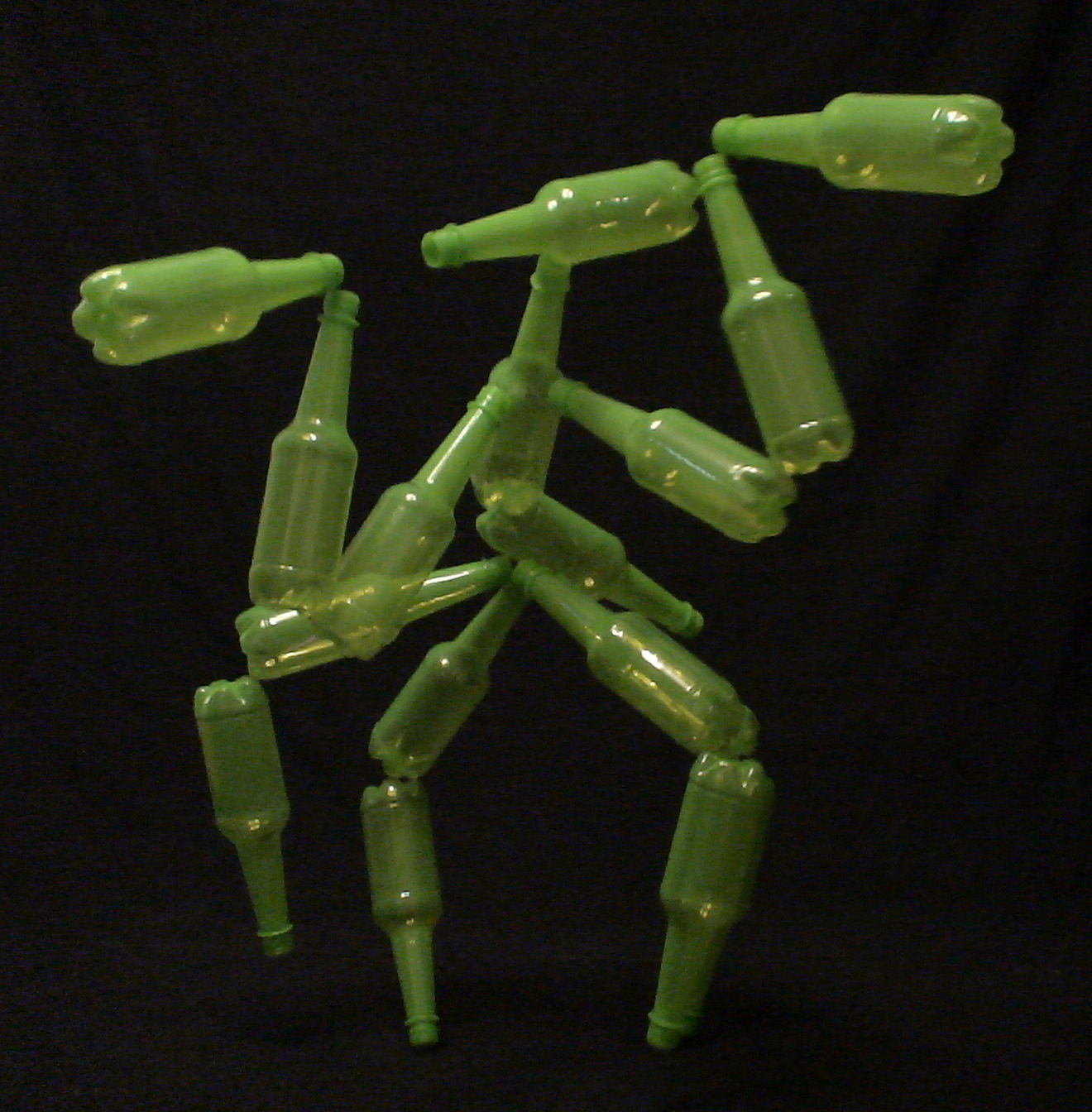
Object Puppet of Nikolai Zykov Theatre, Russia.

Not all forms of puppetry need specially created items to puppet. Object puppets can be created with found everyday objects either assembled in advance or during performance. Señor Wences was a Spanish ventriloquist who became popular through his appearances on the American program The Ed Sullivan Show. His characters included Johnny (a face drawn on his hand) and Pedro (a gruff head in a box) who would talk when Wences opened the box. Similarly, chinface puppetry involves puppet features drawn or attached onto an upside-down chin.

=== Pull string puppet ===
A pull string puppet is a puppet consisting of a cloth body where in the puppeteer puts his/her arm into a slot in the back and pulls rings on strings to make certain movements such as waving the arms or moving the mouth.

=== Push puppet ===
A push puppet consists of a segmented character on a base which is kept under tension until the button on the bottom is pressed. The puppet wiggles, slumps and then collapses. Push puppets are usually intended as novelty toys, rather than as part of professional puppet theatre.

=== Rod puppet ===
A rod puppet is a puppet constructed around a central rod secured to the head. A large glove covers the rod and is attached to the neck of the puppet. A rod puppet is controlled by the puppeteer moving the metal rods attached to the hands of the puppet (or any other limbs) and by turning the central rod secured to the head.

"Rod puppet" is also sometimes used as a term to distinguish hand puppets with rods controlling the hands from "live hand" puppets (hand puppets with additional hands serving as the puppet's hands). The best known examples of this type of puppets are Jim Henson's Muppets, most notably Muppet characters such as Kermit the Frog, Miss Piggy, Gonzo and others, many Sesame Street characters such as Elmo, Bert, Grover and Abby Cadabby, and the main cast of Fraggle Rock.

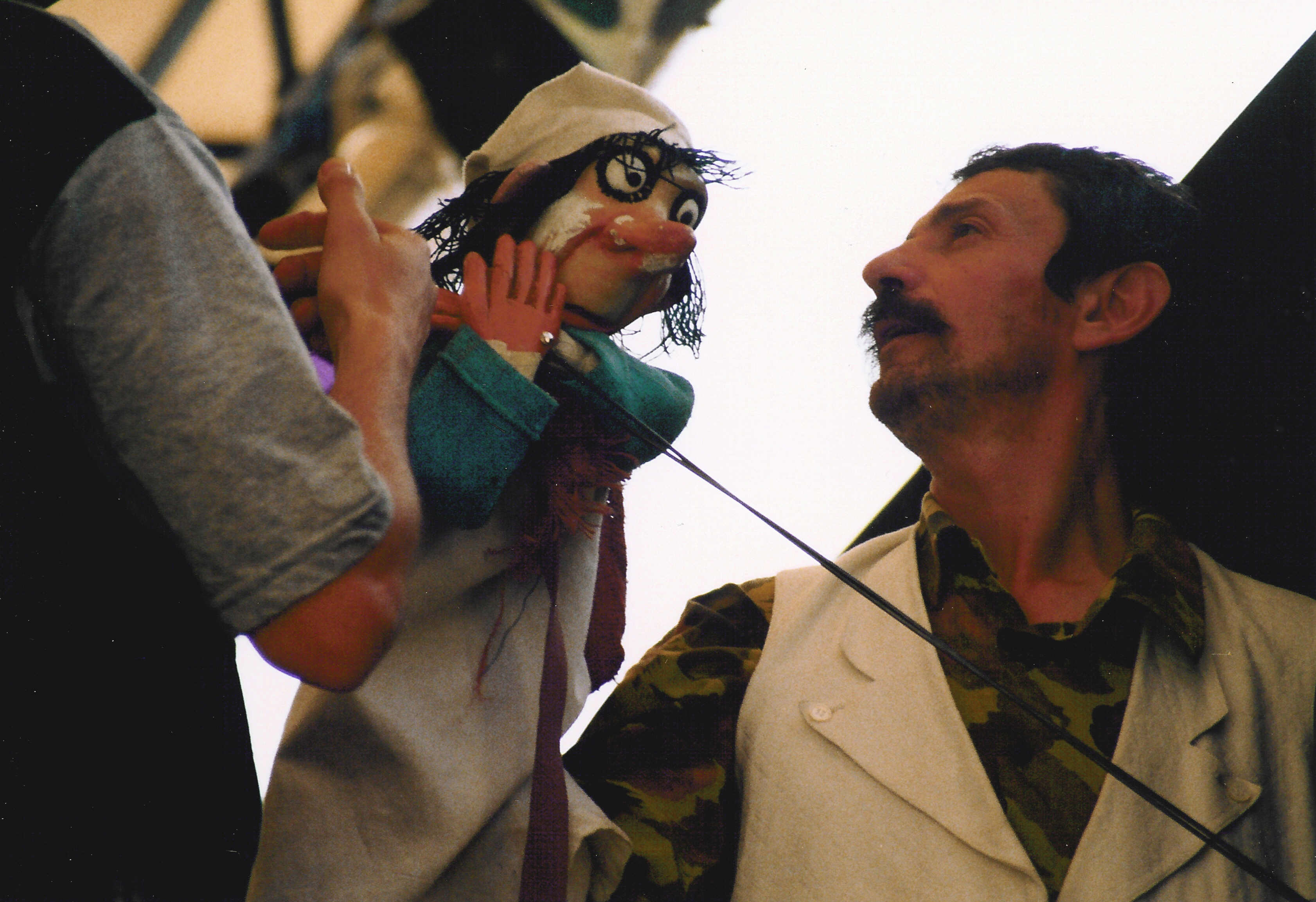
Preparing a rod puppet for a performance of Town Musicians of Bremen, Sibiu, Romania, 2002.

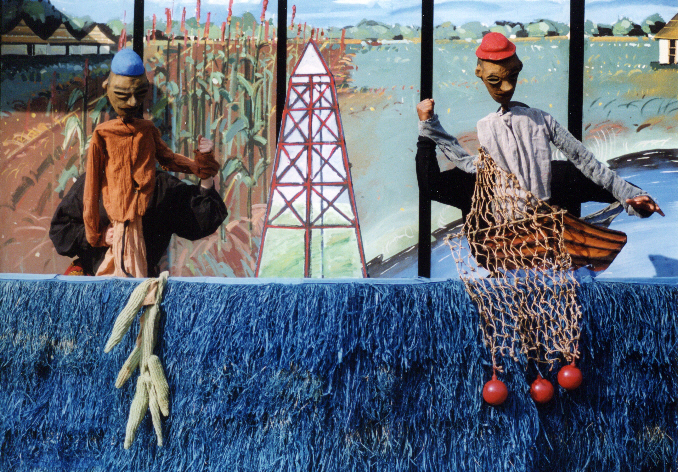
Rod puppets from the Horse and Bamboo Theatre production 'Harvest of Ghosts' 1997

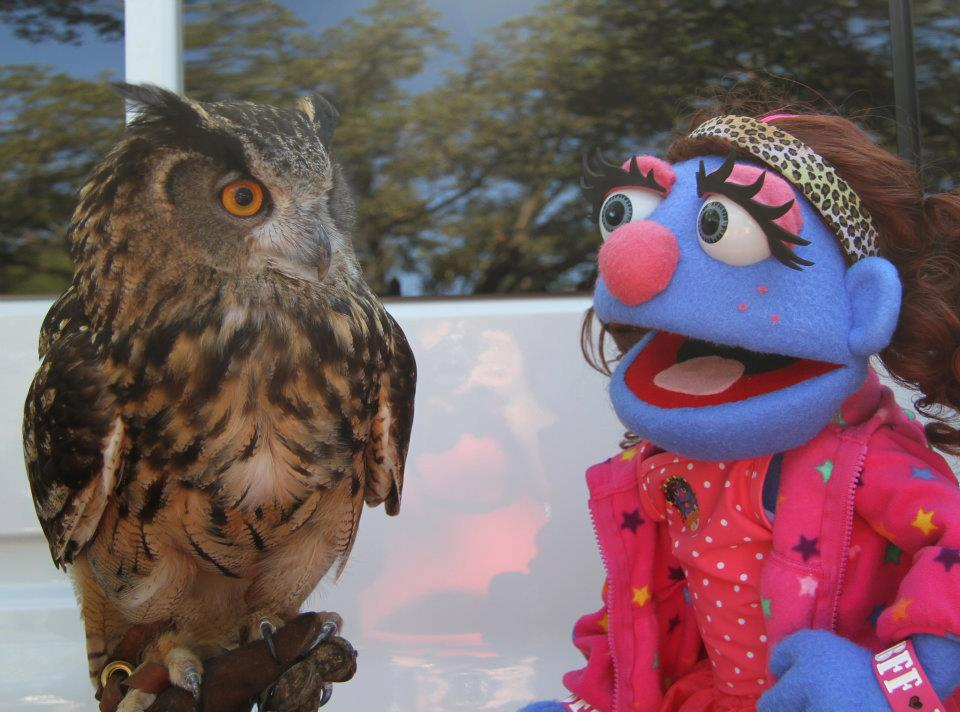
Rod puppet "Bleeckie", meeting an owl, 2011.

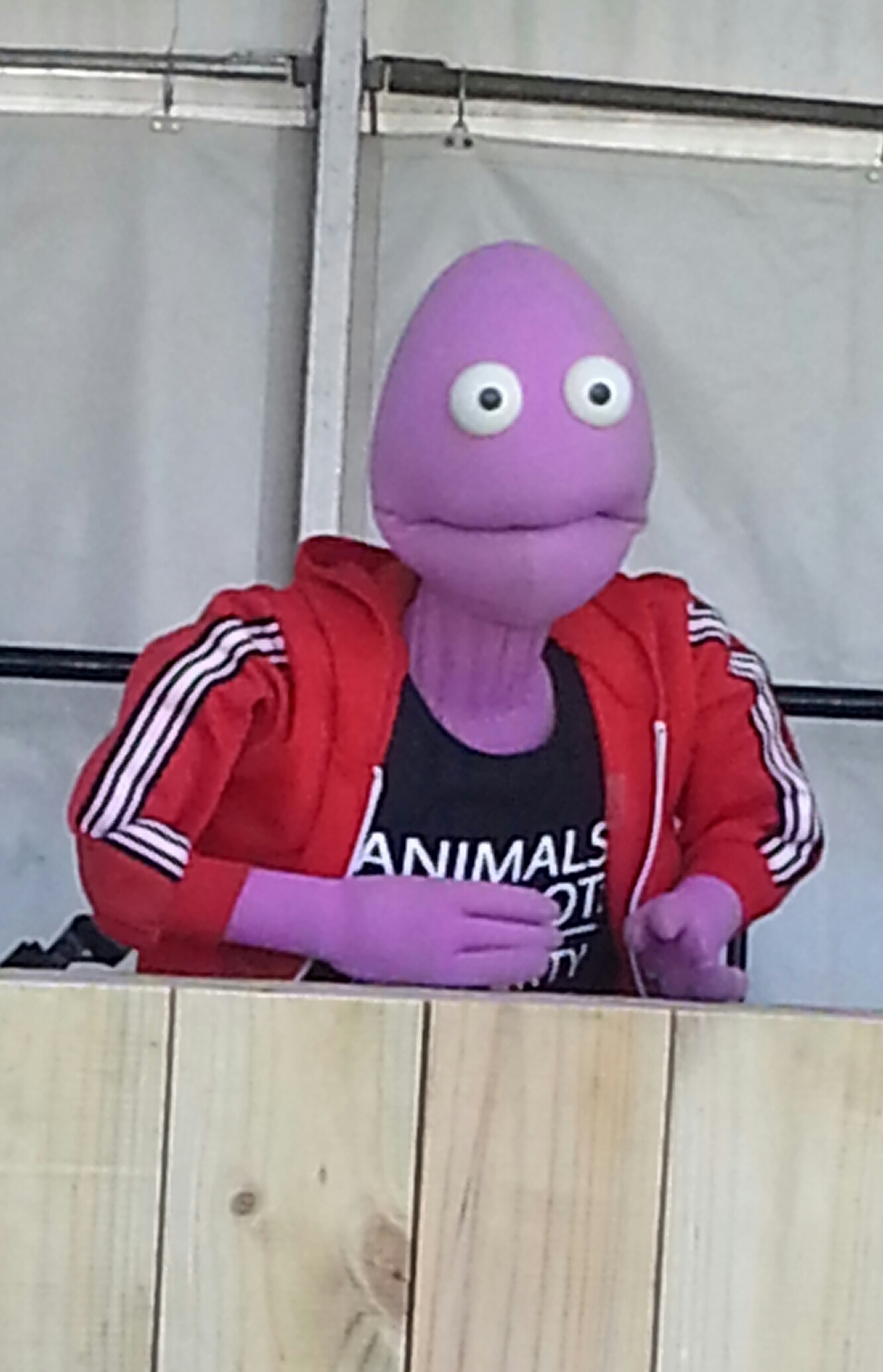
Rod puppet Randy Feltface performing stand-up comedy

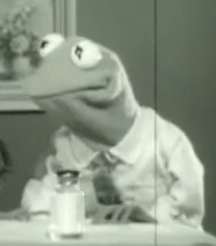
Kermit the Frog, a world-famous rod puppet

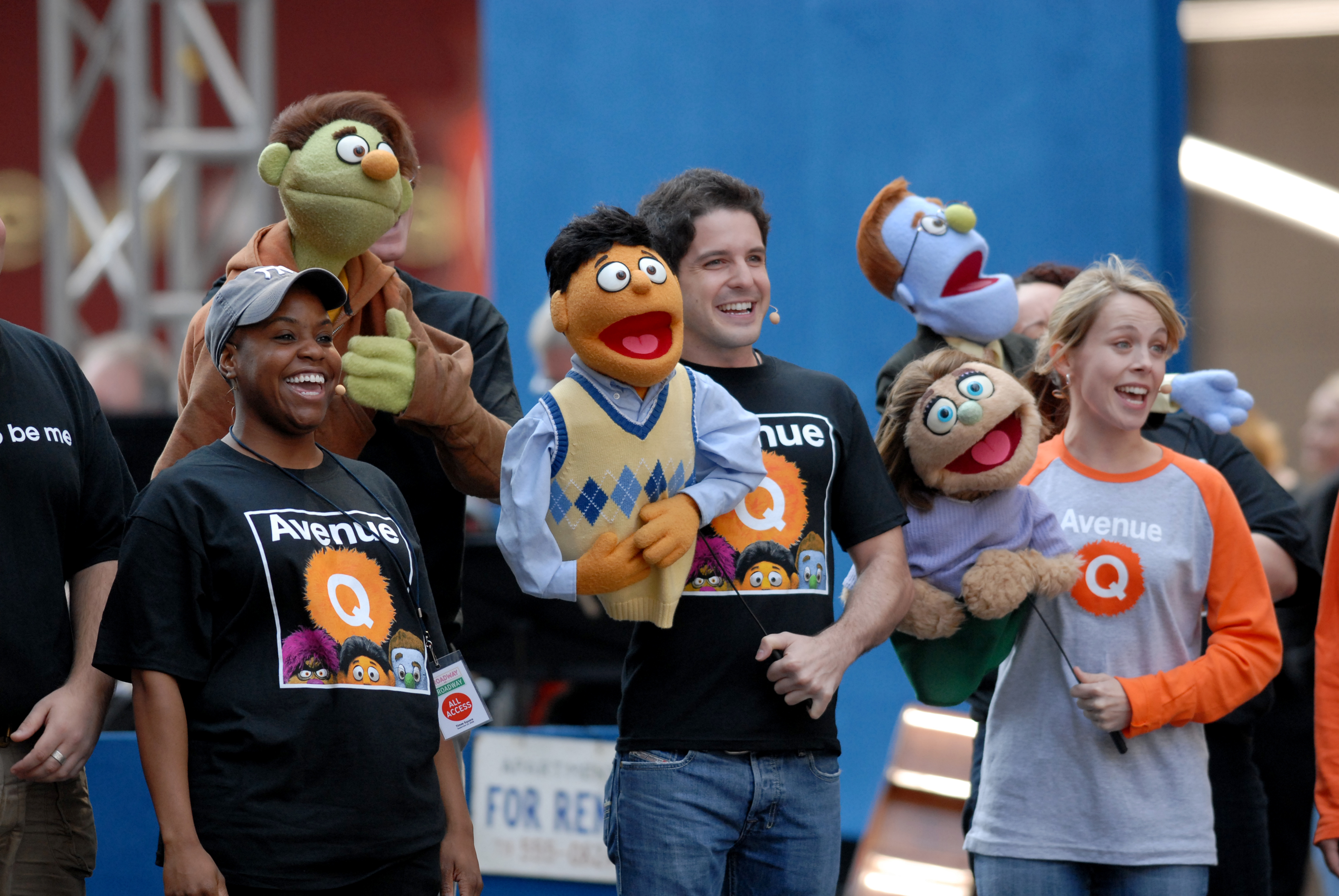
The Avenue Q musical uses a mixture of rod and live-hand puppets.

=== Shadow puppet ===
A shadow puppet is a cut-out figure held between a source of light and a translucent screen. Shadow puppets can form solid silhouettes or be decorated with various amounts of cut-out details. Colour can be introduced into the cut-out shapes to provide a different dimension and different effects can be achieved by moving the puppet (or light source) out of focus. Javanese shadow puppets known as Wayang Kulit are the classic example of this. In China, it became popular from the Song dynasty.

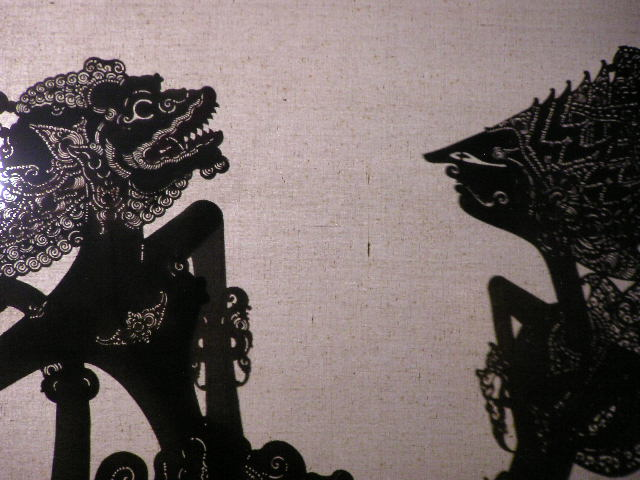
Shadow Puppets, Jakarta, Indonesia

=== Sock puppet ===
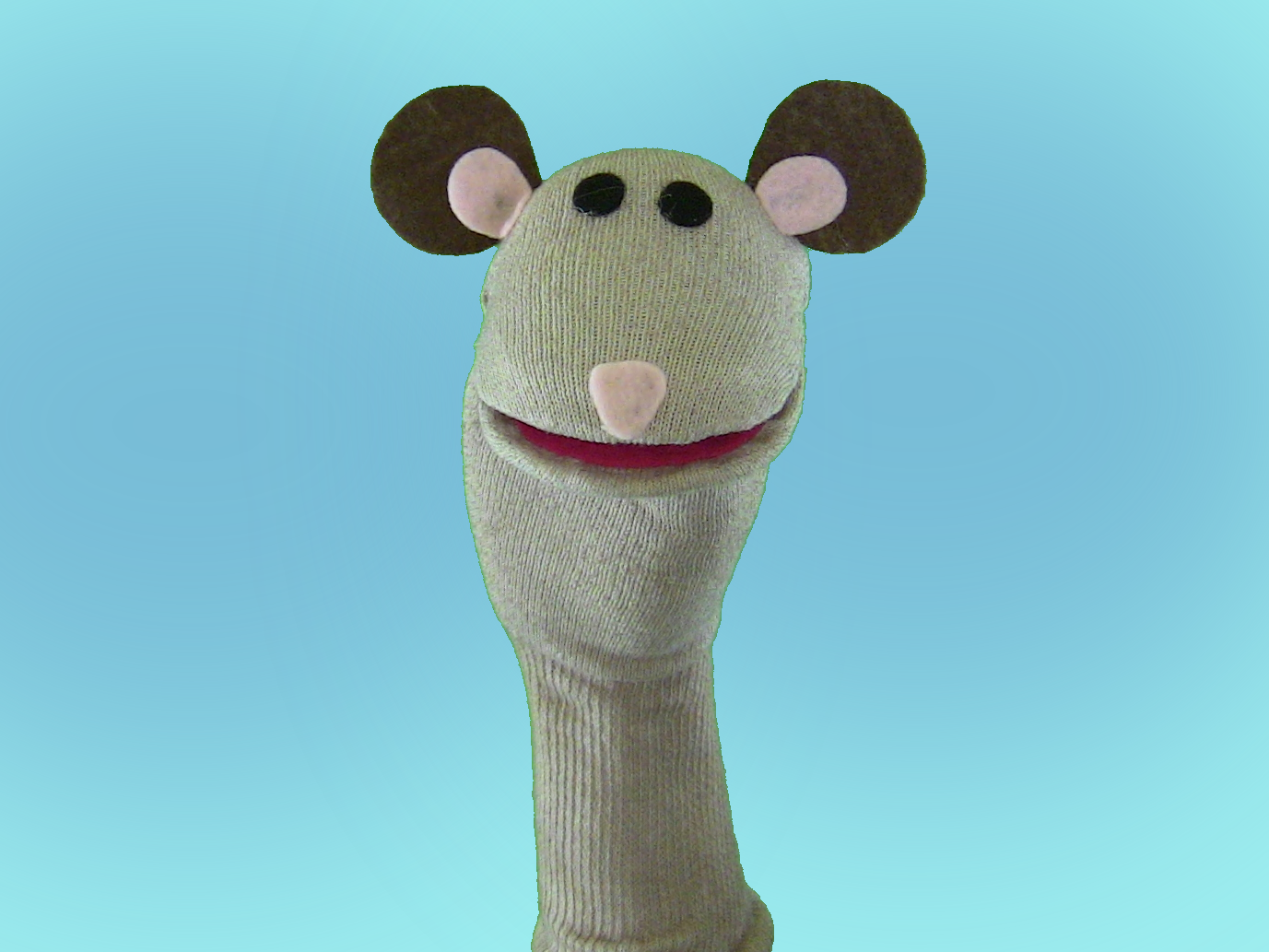
Sock puppet from the Web series Totally Socks

A sock puppet is a puppet formed and operated by inserting a hand inside a sock. The hand is opened and closed to simulate the movement of the puppet's "mouth" and give the impression of speaking. Sometimes eyes and other facial features are added to the sock in order to make the puppet more realistic. Sock puppets are popular in many puppet performances, as they are simple to make and easy to use. They are mostly used in satirical or children's works.

=== Supermarionation ===
Supermarionation is a method of puppetry invented by Gerry Anderson, which he used in his television shows Stingray and Thunderbirds. The puppets were marionettes with electronically moving mouths to allow for lip-synchronised speech. The marionettes were still controlled by human manipulators with darkened strings.

=== Table top puppet ===
A table top puppet is a puppet usually operated by rod or direct contact from behind, on a surface similar to a table top (hence the name). Shares many characteristics with Bunraku.

=== Ticklebug ===
A Ticklebug is a type of hand puppet created from a human hand to have four legs, where the puppet features are drawn on the hand itself. The middle finger is lifted as a head, and the thumb and forefinger serve as a first set of two legs on one side, while the ring finger and little finger serve as a second set of two legs on the opposite side.

=== Toy theatre ===
The toy theatre is a puppet cut out of paper and stuck onto card. It is fixed at its base to a stick and operated by pushing it in from the side of the puppet theatre. Sheets of puppets and scenery were produced from the 19th century for children's use.

=== Ventriloquism dummy ===
The Ventriloquist's Dummy is a puppet shaped like a small human which is operated by a ventriloquist performer to focus the audience's attention away from the performer's activities and heighten the illusion that the dummy is speaking. They are called dummies because they do not speak on their own. The ventriloquist dummy is controlled by one hand of the ventriloquist. Ventriloquism acts are not always performed with a traditional dummy; occasionally other forms of puppetry are used.

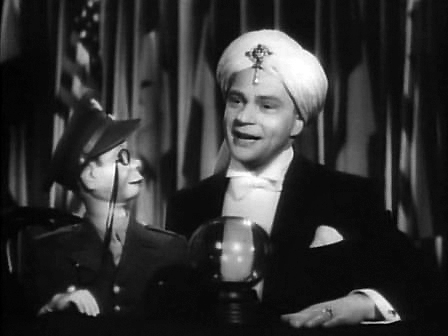
Edgar Bergen, seen with Charlie McCarthy, is one of America's best-known ventriloquists.

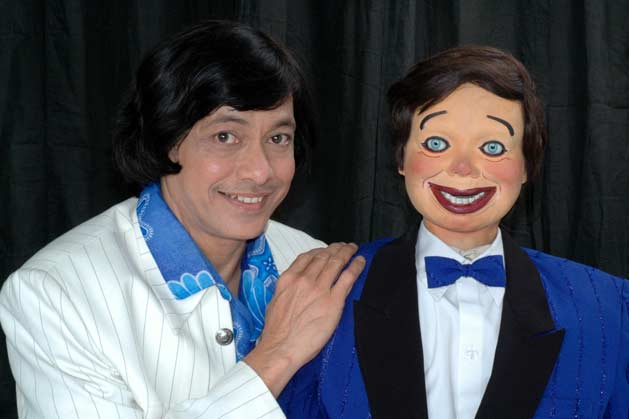
Ventriloquist Ramdas Padhye has been performing in India for over 40 years.

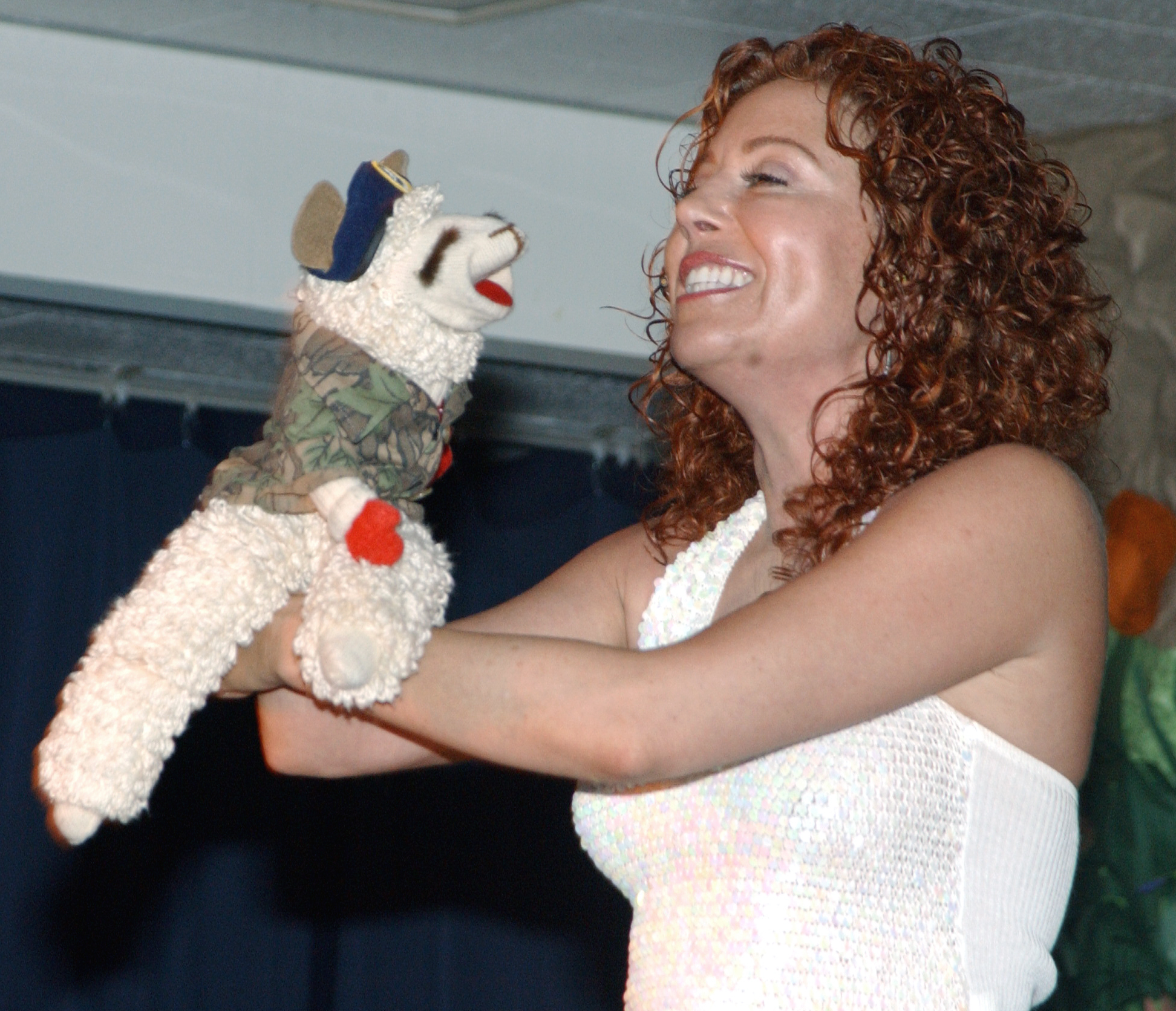
After popular American performer Shari Lewis died, daughter Mallory continued performing Lamb Chop.

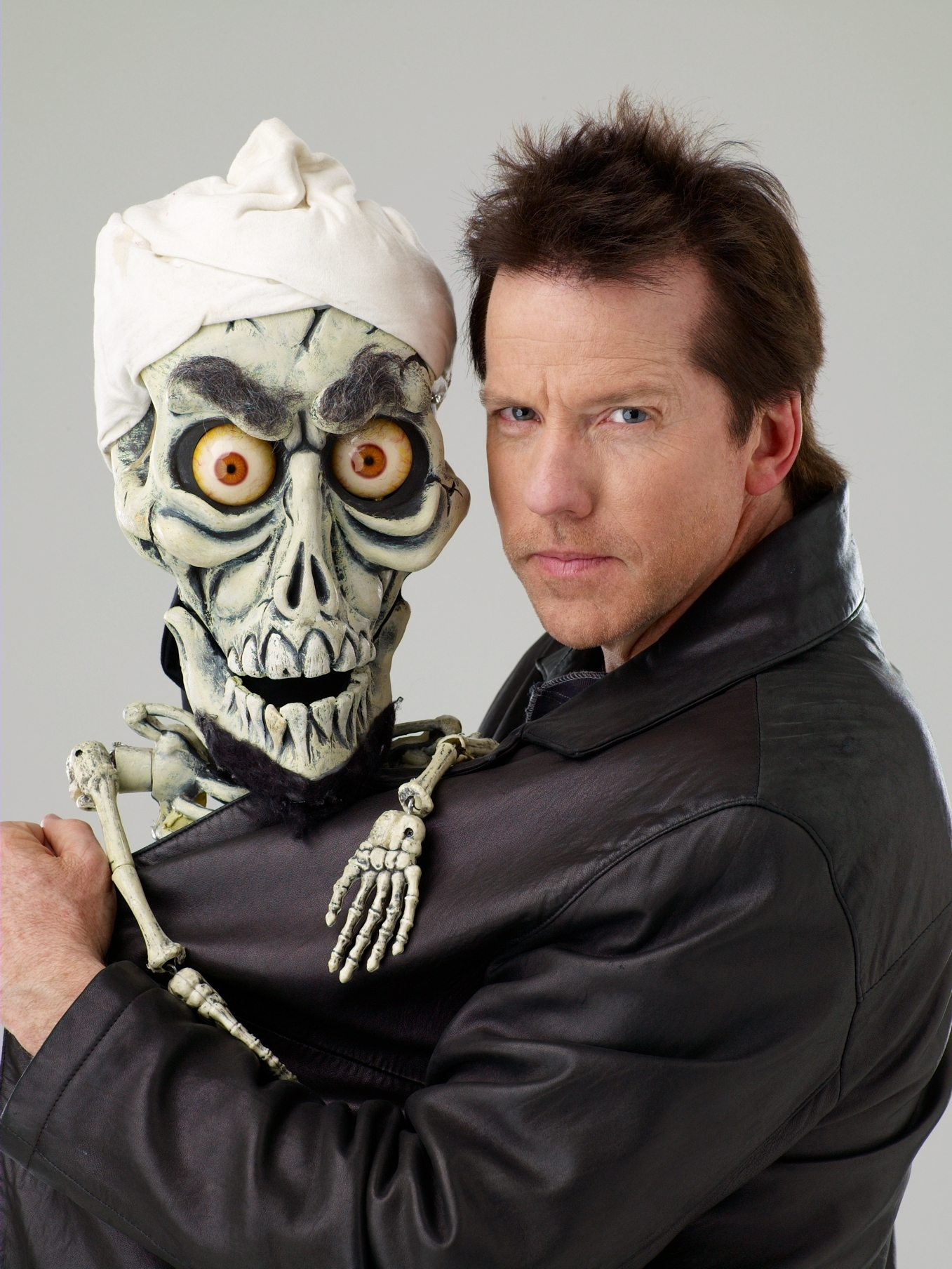
Performers like Jeff Dunham, here with Achmed the Dead Terrorist, have revived interest in North America.

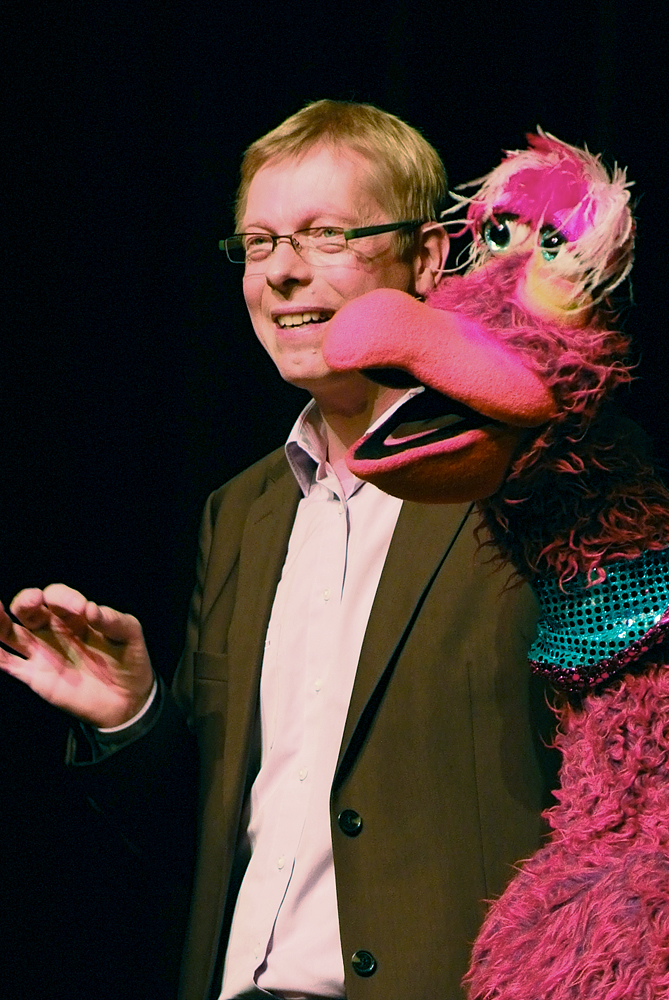
German Jörg Jará's puppet, Olga.

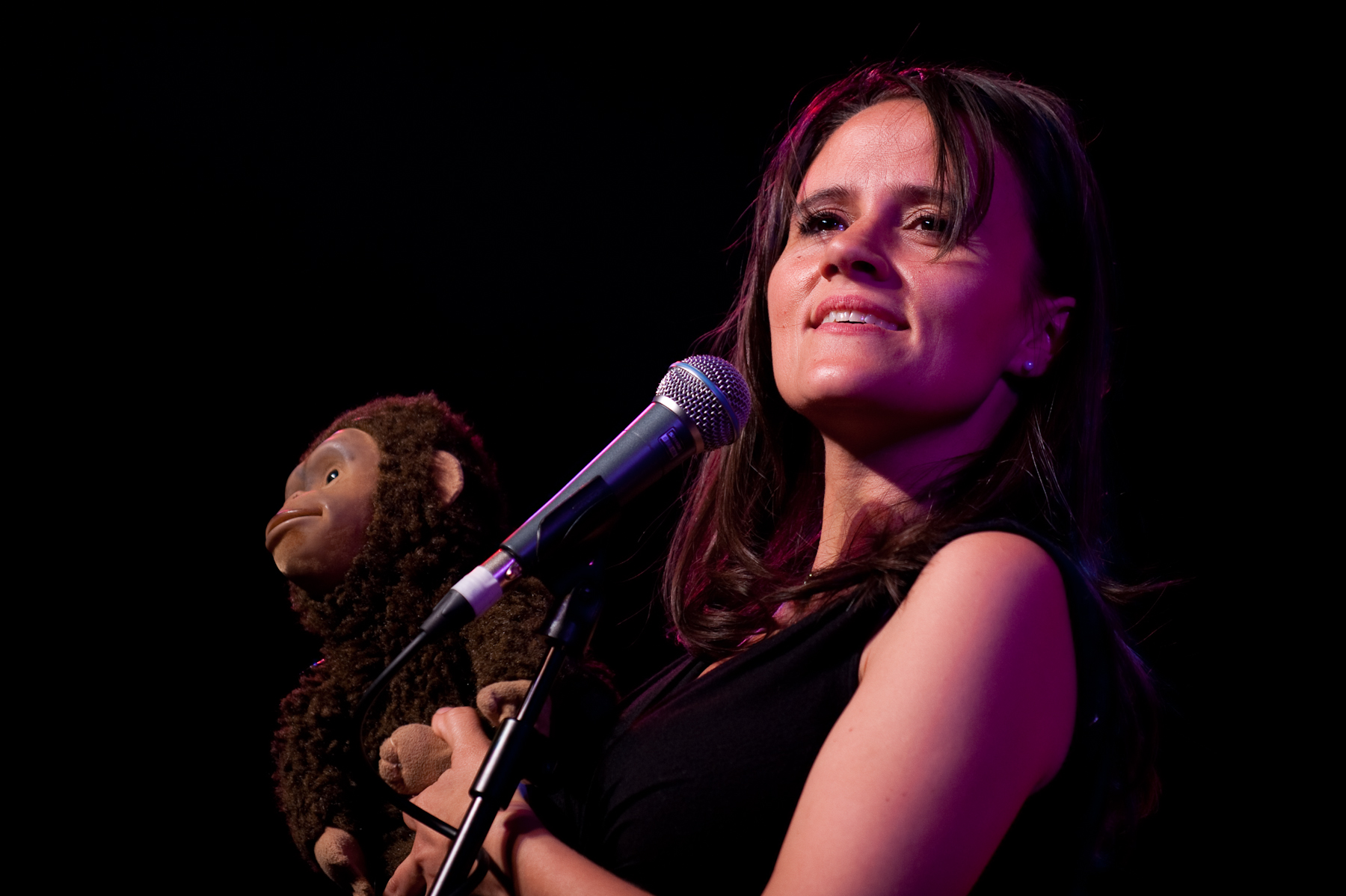
Briton Nina Conti with Monkey in 2010

=== Water puppet ===
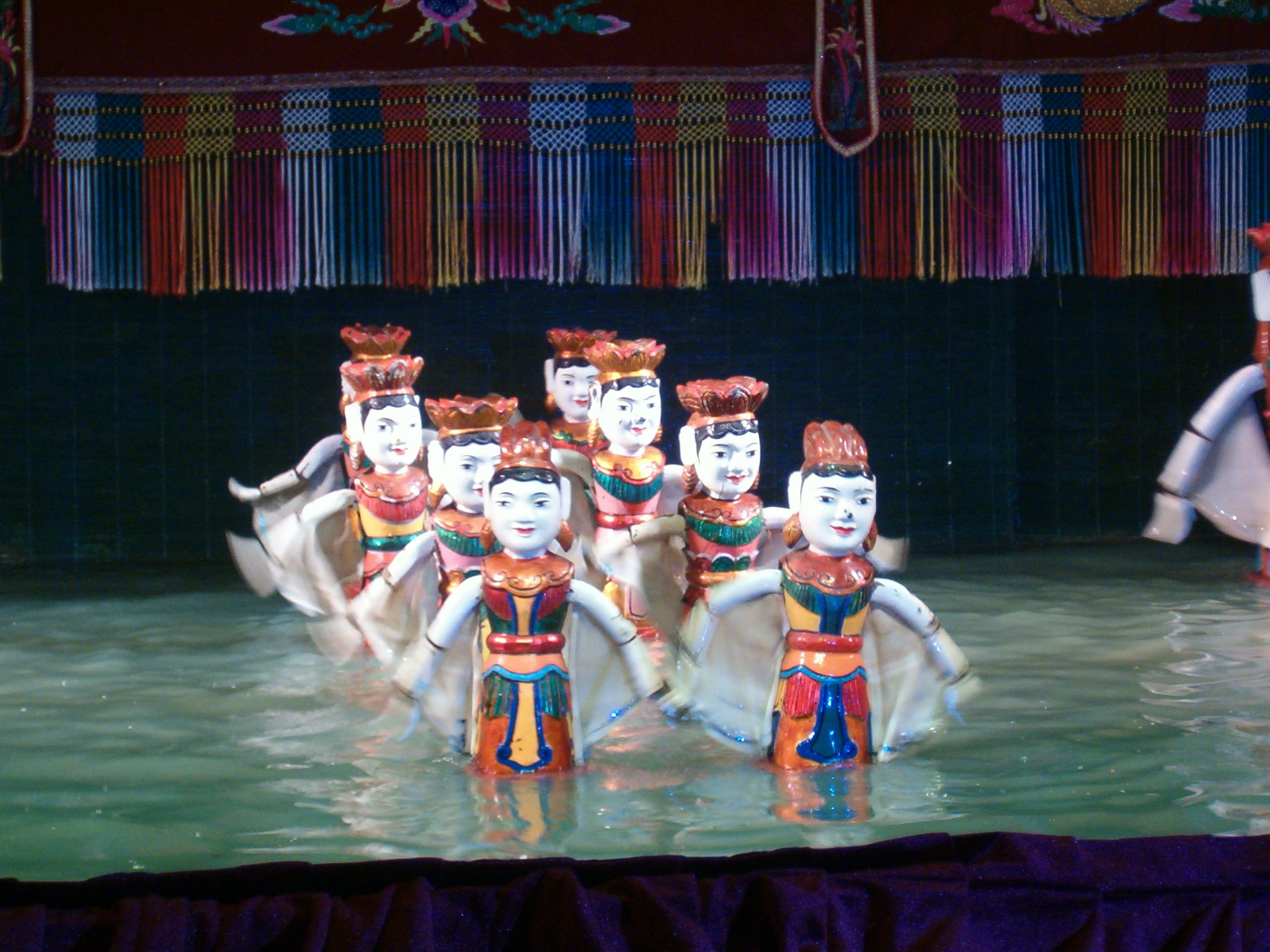
Vietnamese water puppets

A water puppet is a Vietnamese puppet form, the "Múa rối nước". Múa rối nước literally translates to "dance underwater" or "dancing underwater". This is an ancient tradition that dates back to the 10th century. The puppets are built out of wood and the shows are performed in a waist-deep pool. A large rod supports the puppet under the water and is used by the puppeteers to control them. The appearance is of the puppets moving over the water. When the rice fields would flood, the villagers would entertain each other using this puppet form.

The water also provides the setting for traditional stories depicting day-to-day village life. Water puppets bring wry humor to scenes of farming, fishing, festival events such as buffalo fights, and children's games of marbles and coin-toss. Fishing turns into a game of wits between the fisherman and his prey, with the fisherman getting the short end (often capturing his surprised neighbor by mistake). Besides village life, scenes include legends and national history. Lion dogs romp like puppies while dragons exhale fire and smoke and shoot sprays of water at the audience. Performances of up to 18 short scenes are usually introduced by a pig-tailed bumpkin known as Teu, and accompanied by a small folk orchestra.

=== Wayang golek ===
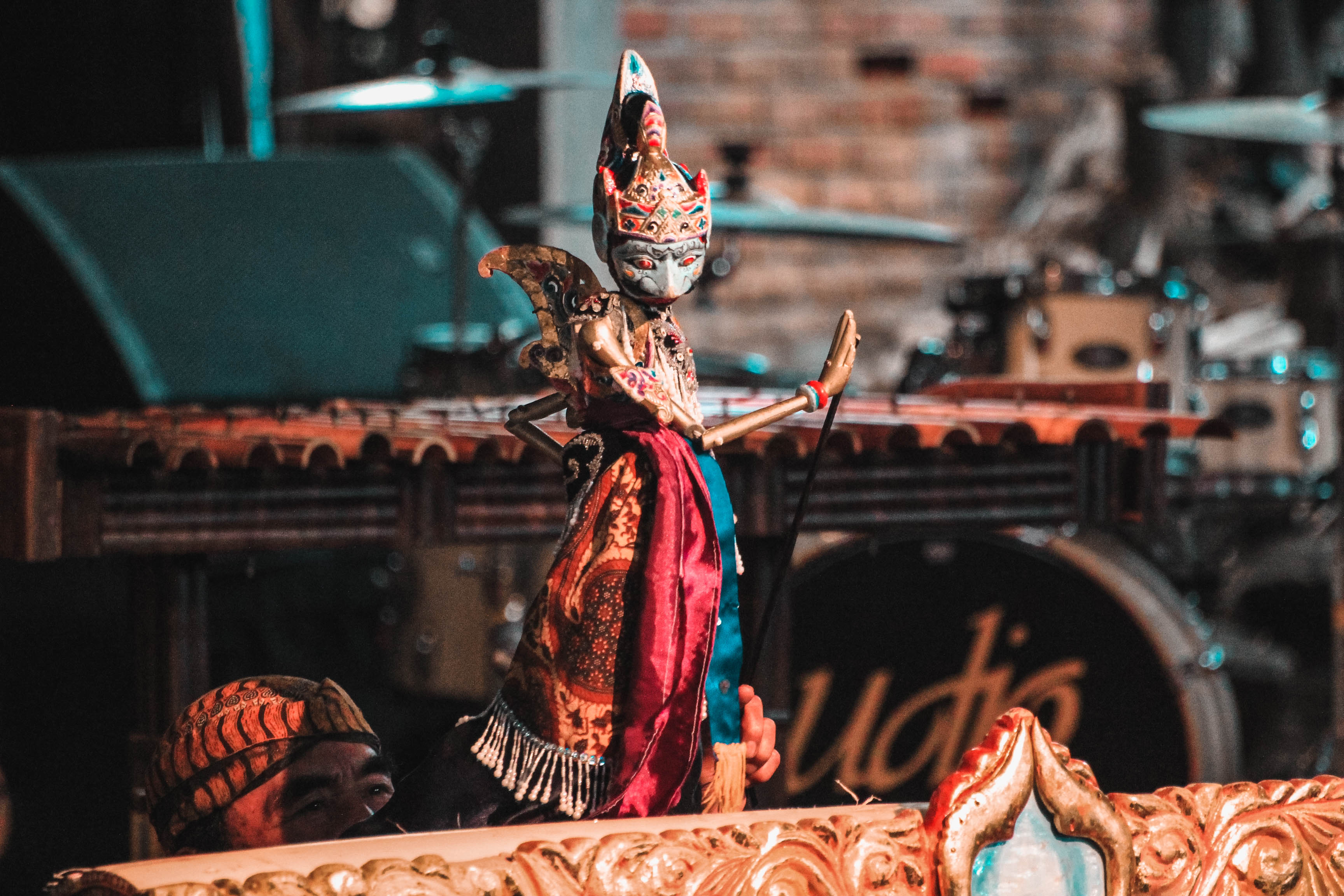
A dalang (puppeteer) playing Ghatotkacha character on the stage

Wayang golek (Sundanese: ᮝᮚᮀ ᮍᮧᮜᮦᮊ᮪, romanized: wayang golèk (in the lemes register); is one of the traditional Sundanese puppet arts from West Java, Indonesia. In contrast to the wayang art in other areas of Java that use leather in the production of wayang, wayang golek is a wayang art made of wood. Wayang golek is very popular in West Java, especially in the Pasundan land area. Today, wayang golek has become an important part of Sundanese culture.

On November 7, 2003, UNESCO designated wayang the flat leather shadow puppet (wayang kulit), the flat wooden puppet (wayang klitik), and the three-dimensional wooden puppet (wayang golek) theatre, as a Masterpiece of the Oral and Intangible Heritage of Humanity. In return for the acknowledgment, UNESCO required Indonesians to preserve the tradition.

=== Rajasthani Puppet ===
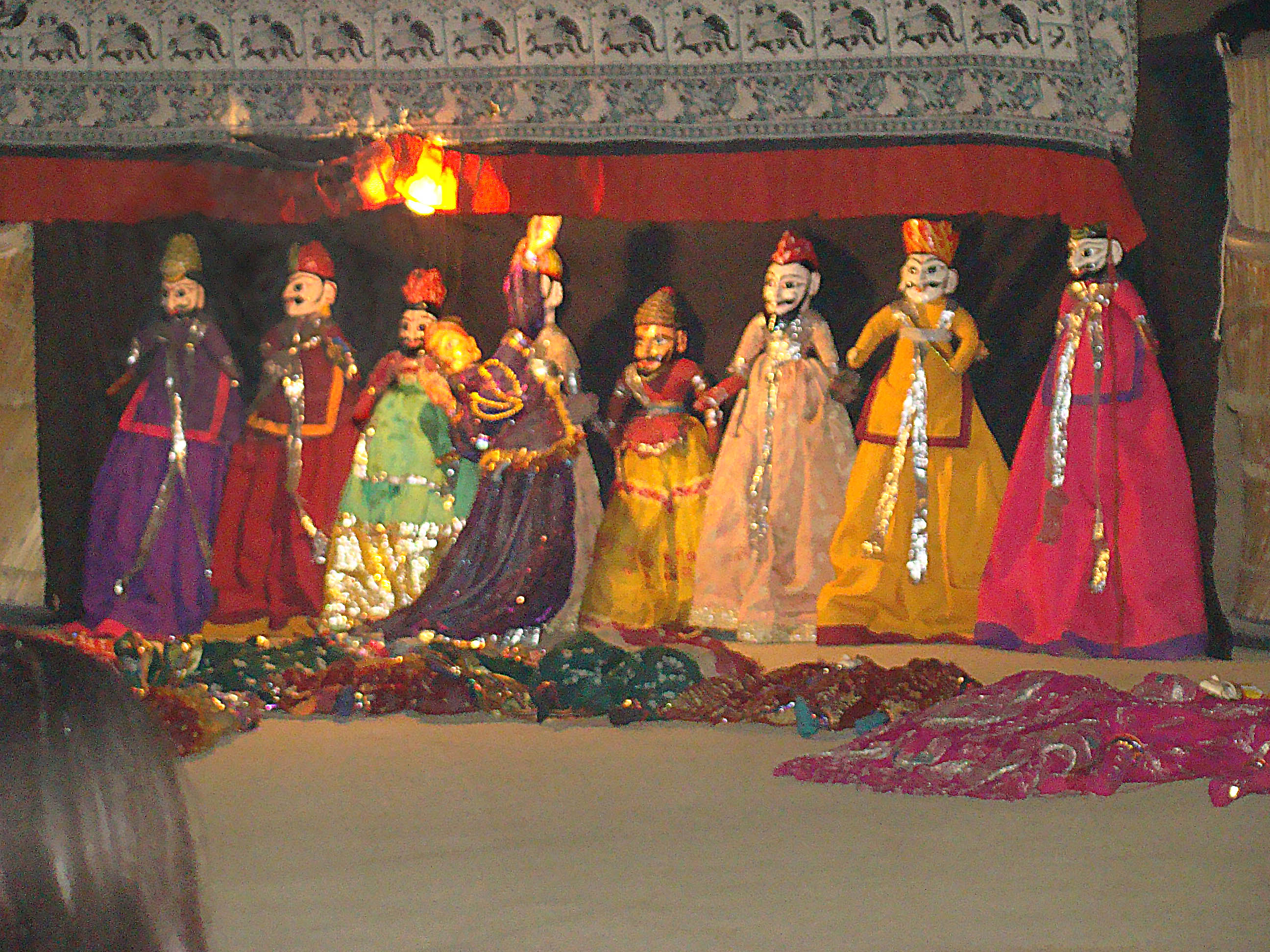
A Kathputli show in Mandawa, Rajasthan, India

Painted wooden heads, hands made just by stuffing clothes or cotton into the sleeve of the dress, with painted appearances, angled eyebrows, mustache for men and nose ring for ladies, and huge expressive eyes all over, manikins are hung with dresses produced using sequined old textures. The puppeteers, known as "Kathputliwalas" skillfully manipulate the puppets while also providing voice and narration for the characters. They use their hands and feet to control the strings and often perform with live music, using instruments like the dholak (a double-headed drum) and the sarangi (a bowed string instrument).

Rajasthan puppetry performances are typically accompanied by lively folk songs and dances, creating a vibrant and engaging atmosphere. The stories depicted in the puppet shows often revolve around historical events, mythological tales, social issues, and moral lessons. The performances are not only entertaining but also serve as a medium to convey cultural and social messages to the audience.

== Idioms and cultural expressions ==
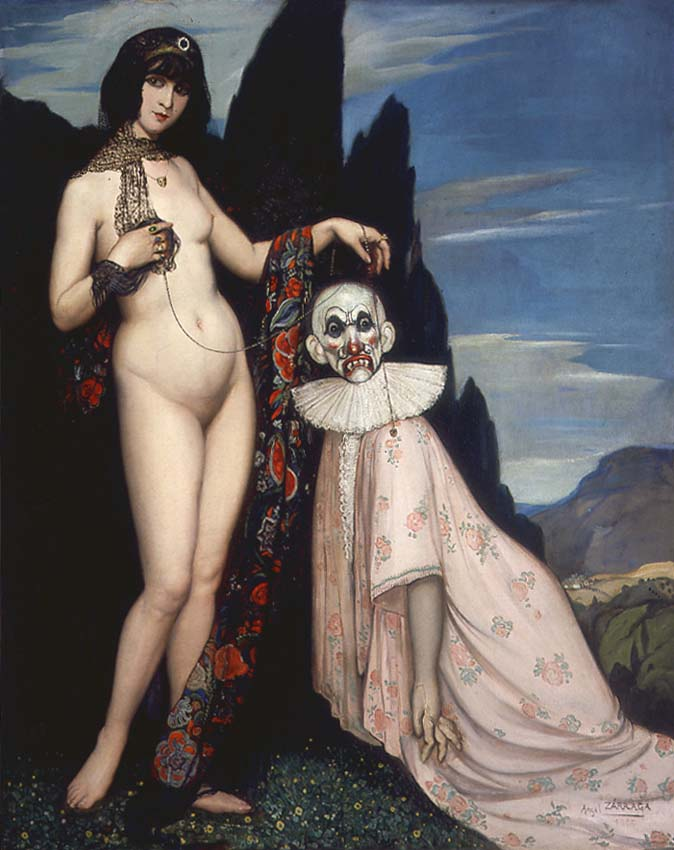
La femme et le pantin (woman and puppet) painting by Ángel Zárraga, 1909

The word puppet can mean a political leader installed, supported and controlled by powerful external forces without legitimacy in the country itself. In modern times, that usually implies no democratic mandate from the country's electorate; in earlier times, it could have meant a monarch imposed from outside, who was not a member of a country's established ruling dynasty or was unrecognised by its nobility. "Puppet government", "puppet regime" and "puppet state" are derogatory terms for a government that is in charge of a region or country but only through being installed, supported and controlled by a more powerful outside government. An example is Vidkun Quisling, a Norwegian fascist leader during the Second World War who collaborated with Nazi Germany and led a puppet government.

In a more general sense, a puppet is any person who is controlled by another by reasons of (for instance) undue influence, intellectual deficiency, or lack of character or charisma. Science fiction writer Robert A. Heinlein's novel The Puppet Masters depicts alien parasites who attach themselves to human beings and control their actions.

Poppet, a word that sounds similar, is sometimes a term of endearment, similar to "love", "pet", "doll" or "dear". It alludes to folk-magic and witchcraft, where a poppet is a special doll created to represent a person for the purpose of casting healing, fertility, or binding spells.

Sock puppet is used on social media as a term to describe fake accounts used to spread political disinformation.

== See also ==
- List of highest grossing puppet films
- Animation
- Animatronics
- Das Spielhaus - East German puppet-based TV program
- Digital puppetry
- Jumping jack (toy)
- Karakuri ningyō - Mechanized puppets or automata from Japan
- Kenya Institute of Puppet Theatre (KIPT)
- Lübeck Museum of Theatre Puppets
- The Muppets, a cast of puppets from an American TV series.
- Pelham puppets
- Persian theatre
- Pierieliepiepielo
- Punch and Judy
- Puppetry
- stop motion
- Ventriloquist
- Ventriloquism
- Rajasthani Puppet - String marionettes originating from the state of Rajasthan in India
- Supermarionation - Advanced string puppetry techniques utilized in productions by AP Films
- State Puppet Theatre of Fairy Tales

== Books and articles ==
- Baird, Bil (1966). The Art of the Puppet. Plays. ISBN 0-8238-0067-9.
- Beaton, Mabel; Les Beaton (1948). Marionettes: A Hobby for Everyone. New York: Thomas Y. Crowell Company.
- Bell, John (2000). Strings, Hands, Shadows: A Modern Puppet History. Detroit, USA: Detroit Institute of Art. ISBN 0-89558-156-6.
- Binyon, Helen (1966). Puppetry Today. London: Studio Vista Limited.
- Choe, Sang-su (1961). A Study of the Korean Puppet Play. The Korean Books Publishing Company Ltd.
- Currell, David (1985). The Complete Book of Puppetry. London: A & C Black (Publishers) Ltd. ISBN 0-7136-2429-9.
- Currell, David (1992). An Introduction to Puppets and Puppetmaking. London: New Burlington Books, Quintet Publishing Limited. ISBN 1-85348-389-3.
- Dubska, Alice; Jan Novak; Nina Malikova; Marie Zdenkova (2006). Czech Puppet Theatre. Prague: Theatre Institute. ISBN 80-7008-199-6.
- Dugan, E.A. (1990). Emotions in Motion. Montreal, Canada: Galerie Amrad. ISBN 0-9693081-5-9.
- Feeney, John (1999). Puppet. Saudi Aramco World.
- Flower, Cedric; Alan Fortney (1983). Puppets: Methods and Materials. Worcester, Massachusetts: Davis Publications, Inc.
- Gross, Kenneth (2011). Puppet: An Essay on Uncanny Life. Chicago: University of Chicago Press. ISBN 978-0-226-30958-3.
- Latshaw, George (2000). The Complete Book of Puppetry. London: Dover Publications. ISBN 978-0-486-40952-8.
- Lindsay, Hilaire (1976). The First Puppet Book. Leichhardt, NSW, Australia: Ansay Pty Ltd. ISBN 0-909245-06-1.
- Logan, David (2007). Puppetry. Brisbane, QLD, Australia: Brisbane Dramatic Arts Co. ISBN 978-0-9804563-0-1.
- Mulholland, John (1961). Practical Puppetry. London: Herbert Jenkins Ltd.
- Richmond, Arthur (1950). Remo Bufano's Book of Puppetry. New York: The Macmillan Company.
- Robinson, Stuart; Patricia Robertson (1967). Exploring Puppetry. London: Mills & Boon Limited.
- Rump, Nan (1996). Puppets and Masks: Stagecraft and Storytelling. Worcester, Massachusetts: Davis Publications. ISBN 9780871922984.
- Sinclair, Anita (1995). The Puppetry Handbook. Richmond, Victoria, Australia: Richard Lee Publishing. ISBN 0-646-39063-5.
- Suib, Leonard; Muriel Broadman (1975). Marionettes Onstage!. New York: Harper & Row, Publishers. ISBN 0-06-014166-2.
