= Hand puppet =

Puppet controlled by hands

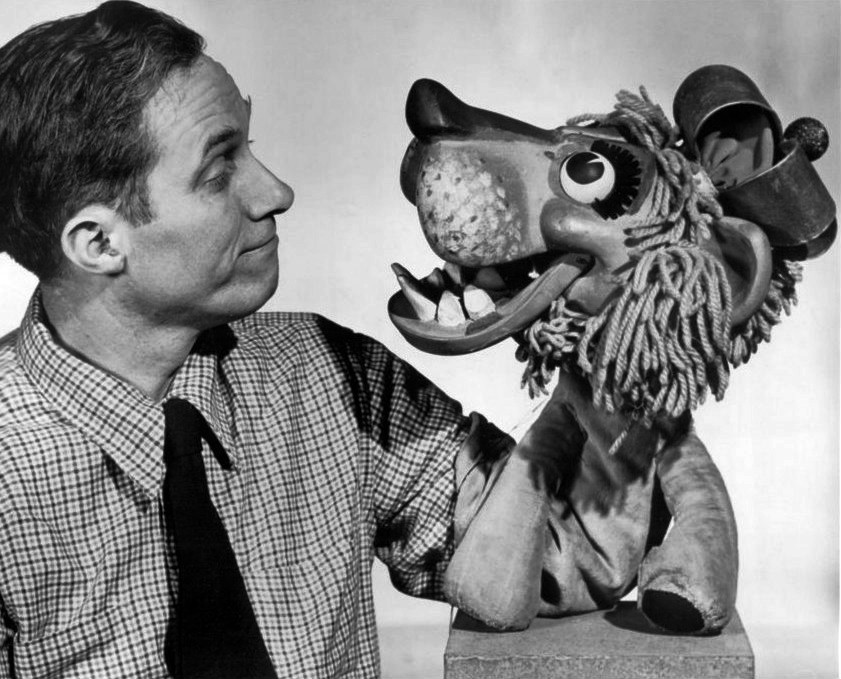
Bil Baird with his hand puppet Charlemane

A hand puppet is a type of puppet that is primarily controlled by the performer's hand inside the body and head of the puppet like a glove. Other parts of the puppet may be controlled by different means, e.g., by rods operated by the puppeteer's free hand, or strings or levers. Simple hand puppets often have no significant manipulable parts at all. Finger puppets are not considered hand puppets as they are used only on a finger.

== Types of hand puppets ==
=== Simple hand puppets ===
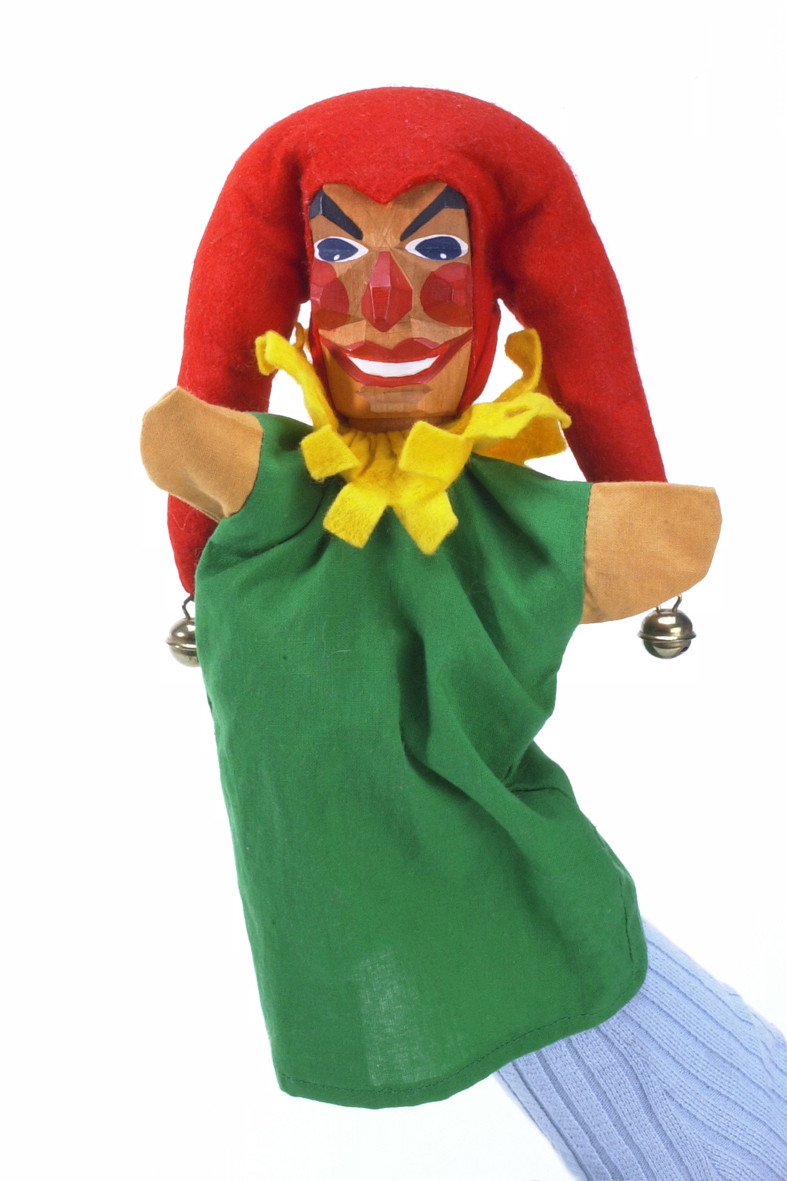
A Kasperle hand puppet

The simplest hand puppets are those with few or no moving parts. They can be stiff, made from a hard plastic, or more flexible, made from fabric. They typically include some stuffing and attached decorations for eyes, nose, mouth etc. The mouth may be a mere decoration that does not open and close, or the thumb may enter a separate pocket from the rest of the fabric and will simulate a mandible, allowing the puppet to talk.

Simple hand puppets are usually not much larger than the hand itself. A sock puppet is a particularly simple type of hand puppet made from a sock slid onto a hand. A glove puppet is slightly more complex, with an internal division for fingers allowing independent manipulation of a character's arms. The unconsumed hand of the puppeteer is usually concealed from the audience to maintain the illusion of the puppet.

Simple hand puppets, especially popular licensed characters, are sometimes distributed as children toys or party favors. Some uses of this type of puppetry are found in shows like Kukla, Fran and Ollie and the Neighborhood of Make-Believe segments of Mister Rogers' Neighborhood.

=== Rod-hand puppets ===
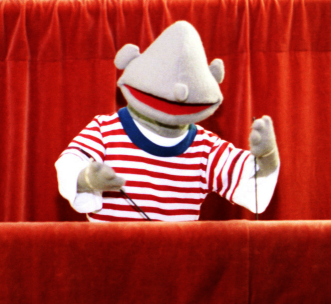
A rod-hand puppet with typical rods to control the arms

A rod-hand puppet features movable arms is manipulated with wooden or wire rods. Some variants exist with additional manipulable parts: (e.g., eyelids that open and close). Many rod puppets depict only the upper half of the character, from the waist up, with the stage covering the missing remainder. Some variations have legs which simply hang from the body of the puppet, but in special cases the legs may be controlled either from behind the stage using rods from below. These can frequently be seen used at carnivals or fairs. Well-known examples of rod puppets are those of Jim Henson's The Muppets and Sesame Street.

=== Live-hand puppet ===
Also called a "two-man puppet" or "human-arm puppet", a live-hand puppet is larger and requires two puppeteers. One puppeteer places their dominant hand inside the puppet's head and operates the puppet's head and mouth, while putting their non-dominant arm into a glove and special sleeve attached to the puppet to operate the puppet's arm, while the second puppeteer operates the other arm. This way, the puppet can perform hand gestures. As most puppeteers are right-handed, the primary puppeteer operates the left hand of the puppet, while the second puppeteer operates the right hand, leading to the secondary role being known as "right-handing". Some characters from The Muppets and Sesame Street fit this category.

== Hand puppets in the classroom ==
Hand puppetry can also be utilized by students and teachers in classrooms. The use of hand puppetry can be encourage students to build confidence in subjects, such as math and reading, because the puppet aides them throughout the learning process. In math, hand puppetry can be used to make abstract topics seem concrete, because the puppets can be more engaging to students. Hand puppetry also helps students improve reading skills because they are more likely to attempt saying unfamiliar words when the pressure is taken off of themselves and placed onto the puppet.

== See also ==
- Glove puppetry
- Glycon
