= Finger puppet =

Puppet worn on a person's finger

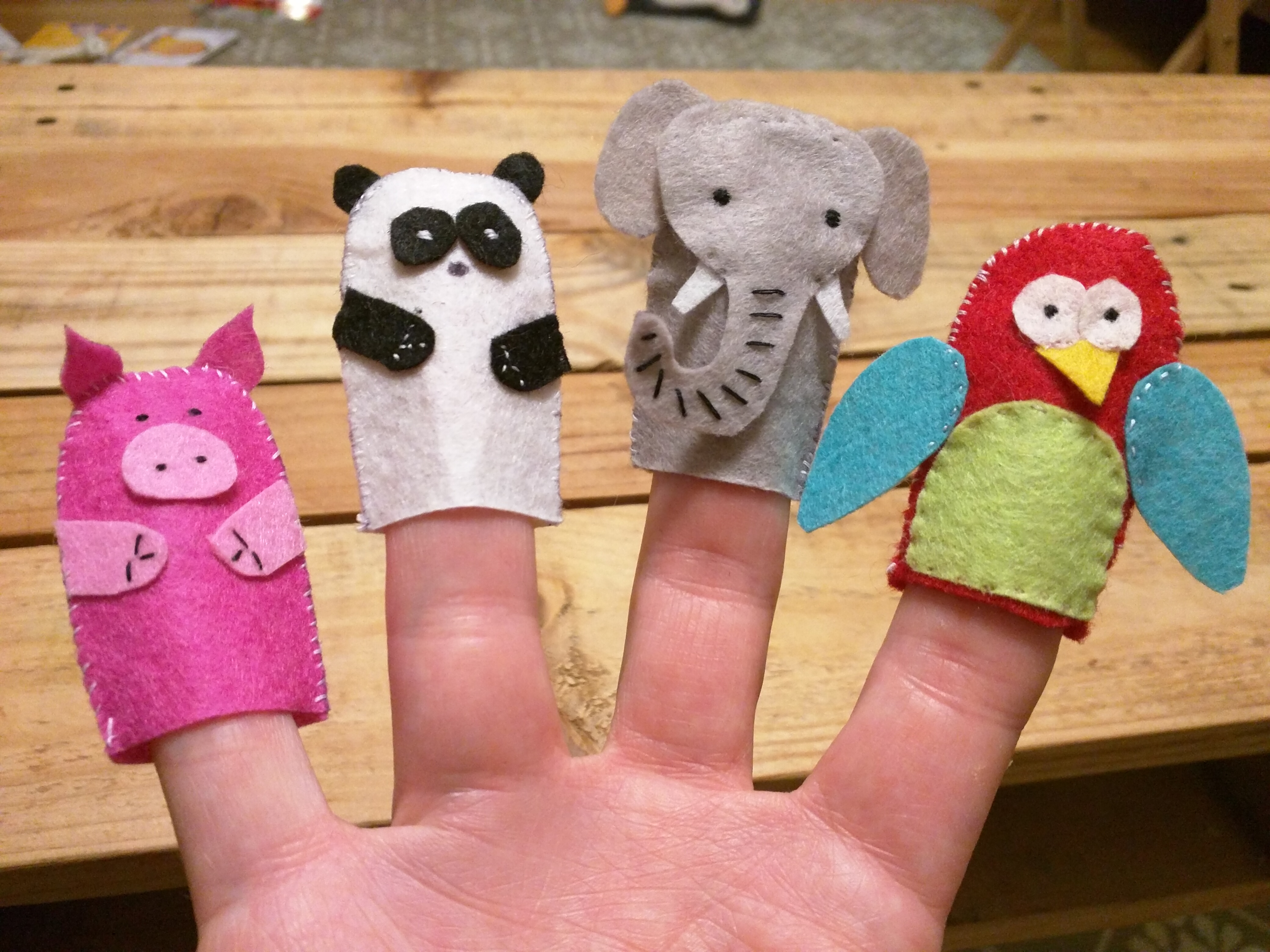
Homemade finger puppets made of felt and sewing thread

A finger puppet is a type of puppet that is controlled by one or more fingers that occupy the interior of the puppet. Finger puppets are generally very simple, consisting of a sheath that the person wearing the puppet (the puppeteer) inserts either one or two fingers into. While the movement of the puppets are limited, multiple finger puppets can be used on each hand, allowing the puppeteer to control many puppets at one time.

== Description ==
Due to their simplicity, the creation of finger puppets is a common craft project for parents and small children and its origin as an art form is unknown.

In addition to their popularity as arts and craft creations, premade finger puppets are sold in a variety of venues and are often included as companions to children books. In at least one known instance, a finger puppet has been sold as a cleaning utensil.

Finger puppets often come in sets. A set is usually just a group or collection of physically separate finger puppets, often intended to be used together in a performance. However, sometimes finger puppets are constructed to be an individual unit of multiple physically connected finger puppets. Occasionally these units consist of two or three puppets (intended for adjacent fingers), but they are most commonly created as sets of five, designed to fit the entire hand of the performer like a glove, intended so all five puppets can be used simultaneously on one hand.

== In media ==
Figurative mentions of finger puppets in the context of expository writing sometimes invoke them metaphorically: That's the most we can explain it without putting on a finger puppet show.

In the movie Hans Christian Andersen, the title character (played by Danny Kaye) tells the story of Thumbelina by singing to and manipulating a small finger puppet he has created to represent the fictional character.

== See also ==
- Glove puppetry
- Sock puppet
