= Pierieliepiepielo =

Dutch puppet character

Mousy Pierieliepiepielo is a Dutch puppet character, created by Jeroen de Leijer and Frans van der Meer. ("Muisje" means "little mouse" in Dutch.)

Mousy Pierieliepiepielo was first seen in 2001 in the popular program Zap! on Omroep Brabant. The regular characters of the show all have long, humorous names: mousy Pierieliepiepielo, mousy Poerieliepoepielie, doggy Waffielieblaffielie, Owly Oerielieboerielie and squirrely Flieflafloflapperierario.

Mousy Pierieliepiepielo became known nationwide as part of the Eefje Wentelteefje TV Show's Villa Achterwerk program. Eefje Wentelteefje has her own television station (EWTV): Mousy Pierieliepiepielo is one of the programs transmitted on EWTV.

From September to December 2006 Mousy Pierieliepiepielo also appeared on Omroep Brabant in the Big Mousy Pierieliepiepielo Quiz on a cultural program Walhalla (in Dutch) on Omroep Brabant. This program was presented by Eefje Wentelteefje and Ferry van de Zaande.
