= Margo (given name) =

Unisex given name

Margo or Margó is a female given name, a form of Margaret. In Estonia, it is mainly a male given name.

Notable people or characters named Margo include:

== Given name ==
- Margo Anderson, several people
- Margo Barton, New Zealand fashion designer and milliner
- Margo Consuela Bors (born 1942), American artist
- Margo Kitsy Brodie (born 1966), American judge
- Margo Buchanan-Oliver (1952–2018), New Zealand economist
- Margo Buchanan, Scottish musical artist
- Margo Burns, American historian
- Margo Cilker, American country singer
- Margo Cohen, American physician and scientist
- Margo Davidson (1957–2008), Canadian musician
- Margo L. Davidson (born 1962), American politician
- Margo Davis, American photographer
- Margo Dydek (1974–2011), Polish basketball player
- Margo Edmunds, American health policy researcher
- Margo Edwards, marine geologist
- Margo Erlam (born 2002), Canadian diver
- Margo Feiden (1944–2022), American art dealer and author
- Margo Frasier, American lawyer and former sheriff
- Margo Geer (born 1992), American swimmer
- Margo Georgiadis, American business executive
- Margo Glantz (born 1930), Mexican writer, essayist, critic and academic
- Margo Goodhand, Canadian journalist
- Margo Grant Walsh, American interior designer
- Margo Lainne Greenwood (born 1953), Canadian senator
- Margo Gunn (born 1956), English actress
- Margo Guryan (1937–2021), American singer/songwriter
- Margo Haddad (born 1988), Jordanian actress
- Margo Harkin (born 1951), Irish filmmaker
- Margo Harshman (born 1986), American actress
- Margo Hayes (born 1998), American rock climber
- Margo Hebald-Heymann, American architect
- Margo Hendricks, American literary scholar and novelist
- Margo Hoff (1910–2008), American painter
- Margo Howard (born 1940), American advice columnist
- Margo Huston (born 1943), American journalist
- Margó Ingvardsson (born 1941), Swedish politician
- Margo Jefferson (born 1947), American writer and academic
- Margo Johns (1919–2009), British actress
- Margo Kaplan, American legal scholar
- Margo Kingston, Australian journalist
- Margo Kõlar (born 1961), Estonian composer
- Margo Lanagan (born 1960), Australian writer
- Margo Leavin (1936–2021), American art dealer
- Margo Lee (1923–1987), Australian actress and singer
- Margo Lewers (1908–1978), Australian painter and sculptor
- Margo Lion (1899–1989), French chanteuse, parodist, cabaret singer and actress
- Margo Lion (1944–2020), American theatre producer
- Margo MacDonald (1943–2014), Scottish politician
- Margo Machida, art historian, writer and artist
- Margo Maeckelberghe (1932–2014), Cornish bard and artist
- Margo Malowney (born 1967), Canadian beach volleyball player
- Margo Martindale (born 1951), American actress
- Margo McCaffery (died 2018), American nurse
- Margo McDermed, American politician
- Margo McLennan (1938–2004), British-Australian actress
- Margo McNeil (born 1948), American politician
- Margo Miljand, Estonian politician
- Margo Morgan (1929–2001), British gymnast
- Margo Neale, First Nations Australian curator
- Margo Oberg (born 1953), American surfer
- Margo T. Oge, American engineer and director of the Environmental Protection Agency
- Margo Okazawa-Rey (born 1949), Japanese American academic
- Margo Oliver (1923–2010), Canadian cookery expert
- Margo Price (born 1983), American singer/songwriter
- Margo Reed (1942–2015), American jazz musician
- Margo Reuten (born 1966), Dutch head chef
- Margo Rey (born 1966), Mexican singer-songwriter
- Margo Rose (1903–1997), American puppeteer
- Margo St. James (1937–2021), American activist
- Margo Sappington (born 1947), American choreographer and dancer
- Margo Scharten-Antink (1868–1957), Dutch poet
- Margo Schlanger (born 1967), American law professor
- Margo Seibert (born 1984), American actress and singer
- Margo Selby, British textile artist
- Margo Seltzer, American computer science professor
- Margo Simms, known as Margeaux, Canadian entertainer
- Margo Smith (born 1942), American country music singer
- Margo Taft Stever, American poet
- Margo Stilley (born 1982), American actress and writer
- Margo Tamez (born 1962), American author from Texas
- Margo Timmins (born 1961), Canadian singer
- Margo Todd (born 1950), American historian
- Margo Van Puyvelde (born 1995), Belgian hurdler and sprinter
- Margo Veillon, Swiss-Egyptian artist
- Margo Velema (born 1955), Dutch gymnast
- Margo Vliegenthart (born 1958), Dutch politician
- Margo Walters (born 1942), American alpine skier
- Margo Wilson (1942–2009), Canadian psychologist
- Margo Winkler, American actress
- Margo Woode (1928–2018), American actress

== Nickname or stage name ==
- Margaret "Margo" Durrell (1920–2007), younger sister of novelist Lawrence Durrell, and elder sister of naturalist Gerald Durrell
- Margo (actress) (1917–1985), Mexican-American actress, born María Marguerita Guadalupe Teresa Estela Bolado Castilla y O'Donnell
- Margo (singer) (born 1951), Margaret Catherine O'Donnell, Irish singer

== Fictional characters ==
- Margo Leadbetter, a character in the British sitcom The Good Life
- Margo Lane, a character from The Shadow stories, radio program, and film
