= Lisa Sturz =

American puppeteer (born 1955)

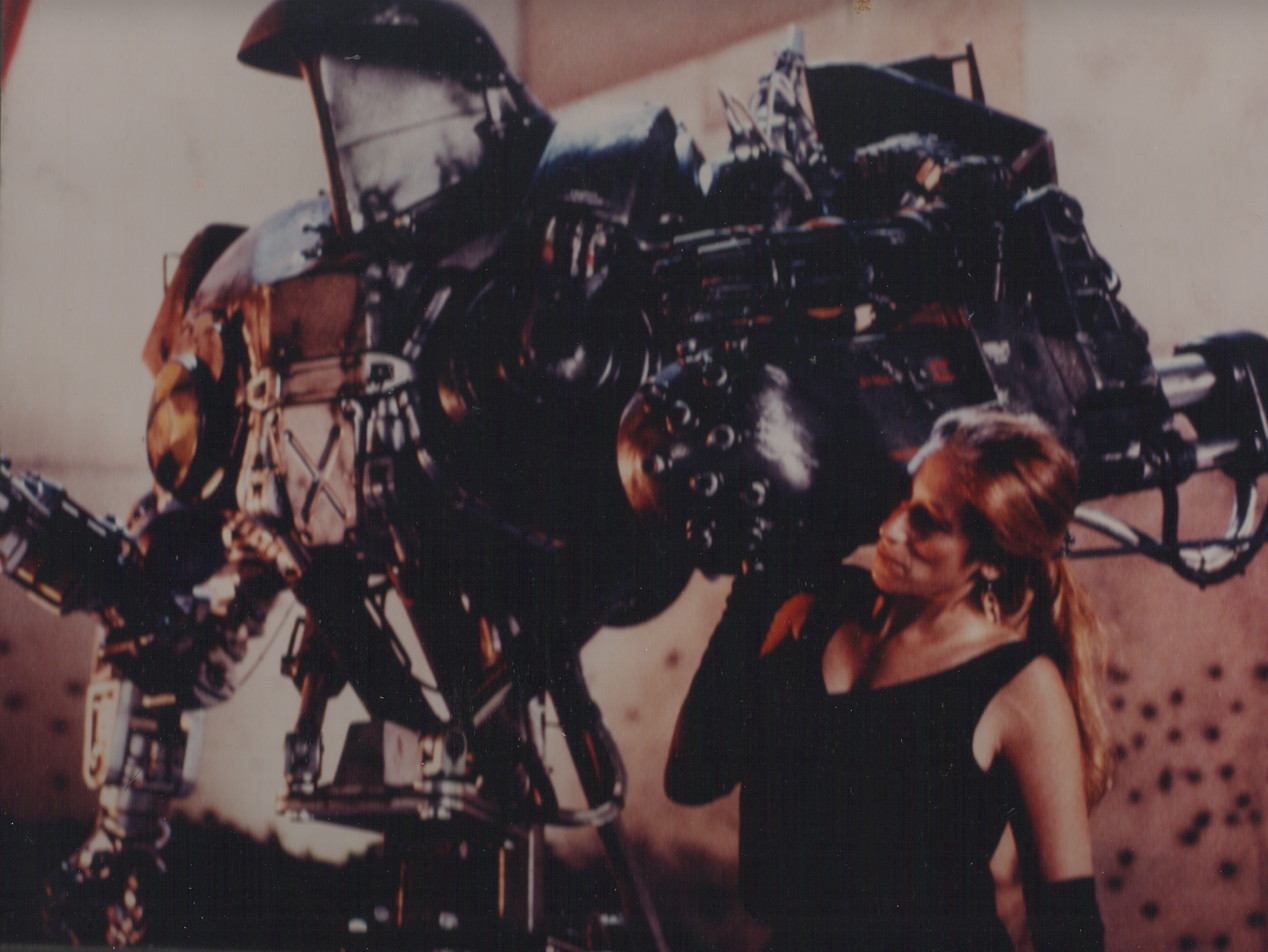
- Born: Lisa Aimee Sturz; February 2, 1955 (age 71); Bayonne, New Jersey, U.S.
- Education: University of California, Los Angeles (MFA in Puppetry, 1985); University of Connecticut (MA in Experimental Theater, 1978); Grinnell College (BA in Theater and Religious Studies, 1976)
- Occupation: Puppeteer
- Years active: 1974—present
- Notable work: Works
- Spouse(s): Francois Manavit (1991—2020); Mark Blessington (2021)
- Children: Manon I. Manavit; Theo L. Sturz
- Website: www.redherringpuppets.com

Lisa Aimee Sturz (born February 2, 1955) is an American puppeteer, arts educator, and founder of Red Herring Puppets, a national touring company established in 1988. Sturz's puppeteering career has spanned more than five decades. She puppeteered in Howard the Duck, RoboCop 2, and Teenage Mutant Ninja Turtles III. She was puppet master for The Ring Cycle at the Lyric Opera of Chicago and The Magic Flute at the Jacobs School of Music and the Atlanta Opera. Her production of My Grandfather's Prayers received a Telly award, and her touring show Aesop's Fables received an UNIMA Citation.

== Early life and education ==
Sturz was born in Bayonne, New Jersey, the youngest of two daughters. Her parents were Helaine (née Glickstein), a teacher, and Melvin Sturz, an insurance broker. They were both of Ashkenazi Jewish descent. Sturz's maternal grandfather was Izso Glickstein and the subject of Sturz's TV show My Grandfather's Prayers. Sturz's paternal uncle was Herb Sturz.

Sturz attended Bayonne High School where she graduated in 1972. She proceeded to Grinnell College and obtained a BA in Theater and Religious Studies in 1976. After her sophomore year, she had a summer internship in props and scenery at the Guthrie Theater, and later became prop master at Grinnell. For the first semester of her junior year, she was selected for a joint program with the Eugene O'Neill Theater Center for acting, directing, and puppetry. At the Center she apprenticed with puppeteers Rufus Rose and his wife Margo who made and performed many of the puppets on The Howdy Doody Show. Sturz graduated from the University of Connecticut in 1978 with an MA in Experimental Theater. She then went to the University of California, Los Angeles (UCLA), where she received an MFA in Puppetry in 1985.

== Early career ==
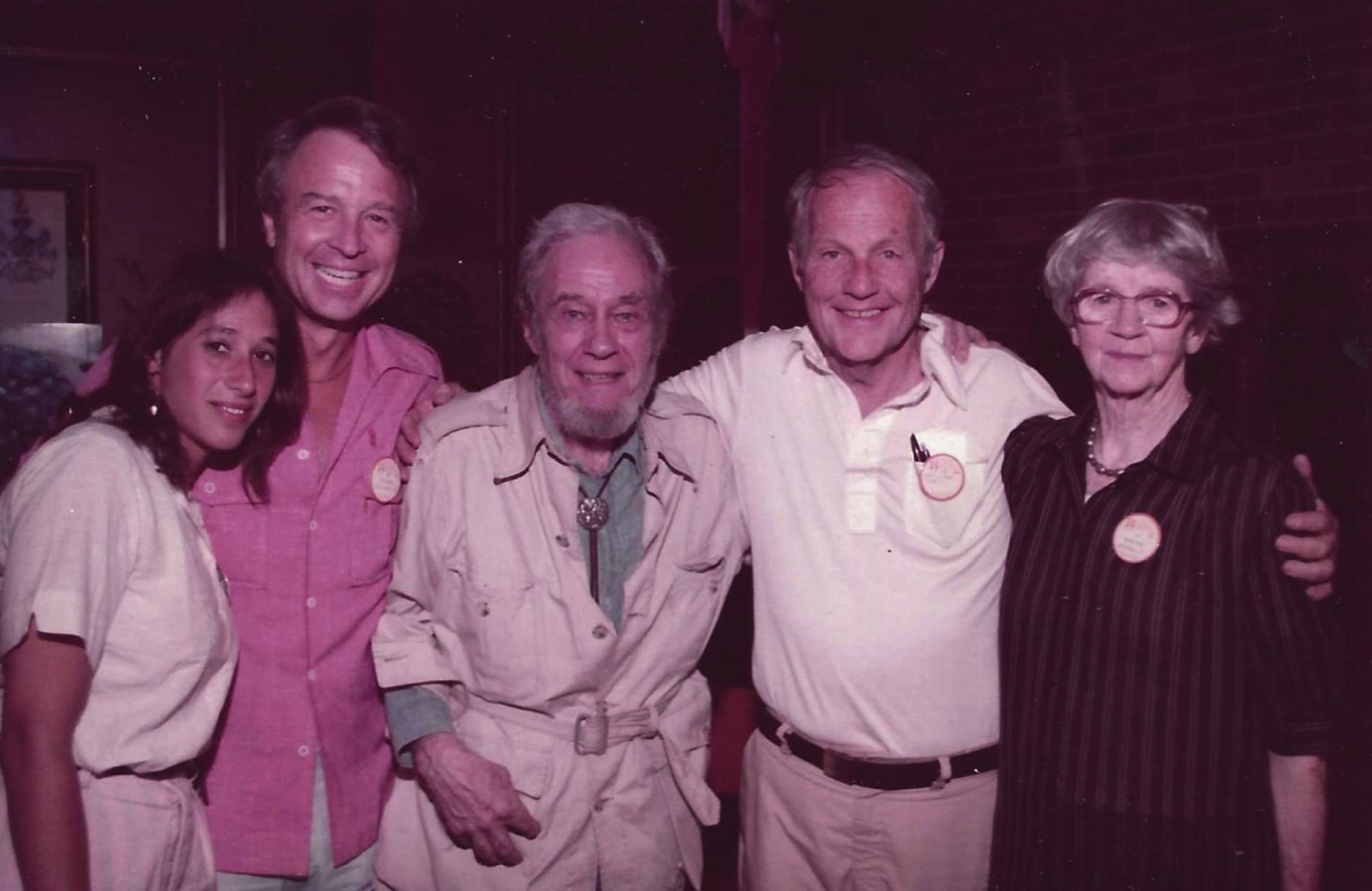
Puppeteers Sturz, Jim Gamble, Bil Baird, Burr Tillstrom, and Margo Rose

After graduating from UConn in 1978, Sturz toured as a puppeteer with Pickwick Puppets, founded by Larry Berthelson. In 1980, Sturz was recommended by Bil Baird and staff at the Guthrie Theatre to serve as director of puppetry at the Haya Cultural Center in Amman, Jordan, which was under the patronage of Queen Noor. During her tenure, Sturz co-directed the production of Uncle Za'rour in 1981.

While a graduate student at UCLA, Sturz was hired by Bruce Schwartz as an assistant puppet builder and performer. In 1983, Sturz worked with Schwartz on Rhubarb Shoots, a Japanese story with traditional wheel puppets. Schwartz had three UNIMA citations before Sturz started working with him. Two years later, Schwartz became the first puppeteer to receive a MacArthur Foundation Fellowship. In 1984, Sturz worked as a Teaching Assistant at UCLA, and on The Muppets Take Manhattan as an uncredited additional muppet performer.

Early in her career, Sturz also worked with or was mentored by Jim Gamble, Bil Baird, Burr Tillstrom, and Margo Rose.

== Works ==
=== Hollywood film and television ===
After graduating from UCLA in 1985, Sturz worked in Hollywood. Her first project was Captain EO where she puppeteered the characters Hooter and Geex. The film starred Michael Jackson, was directed by Francis Ford Coppola, and its executive producer was George Lucas.

Lucas recommended Sturz for Howard the Duck. She manipulated Howard's hands in segments where puppets were used rather than a costumed actor. A list of Sturz's film and television credits is provided below.

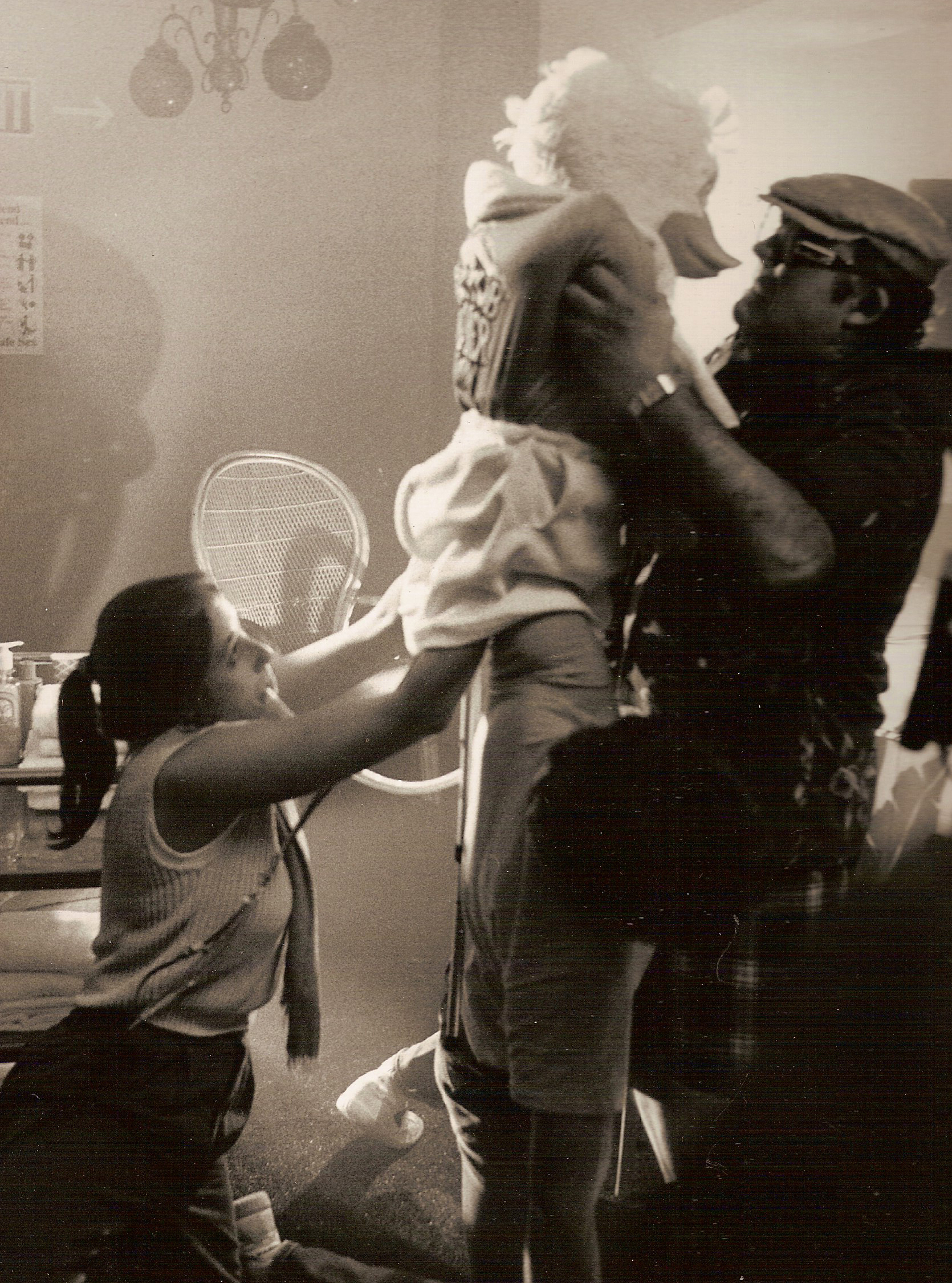
Sturz working with Tim Rose on the set of Howard the Duck

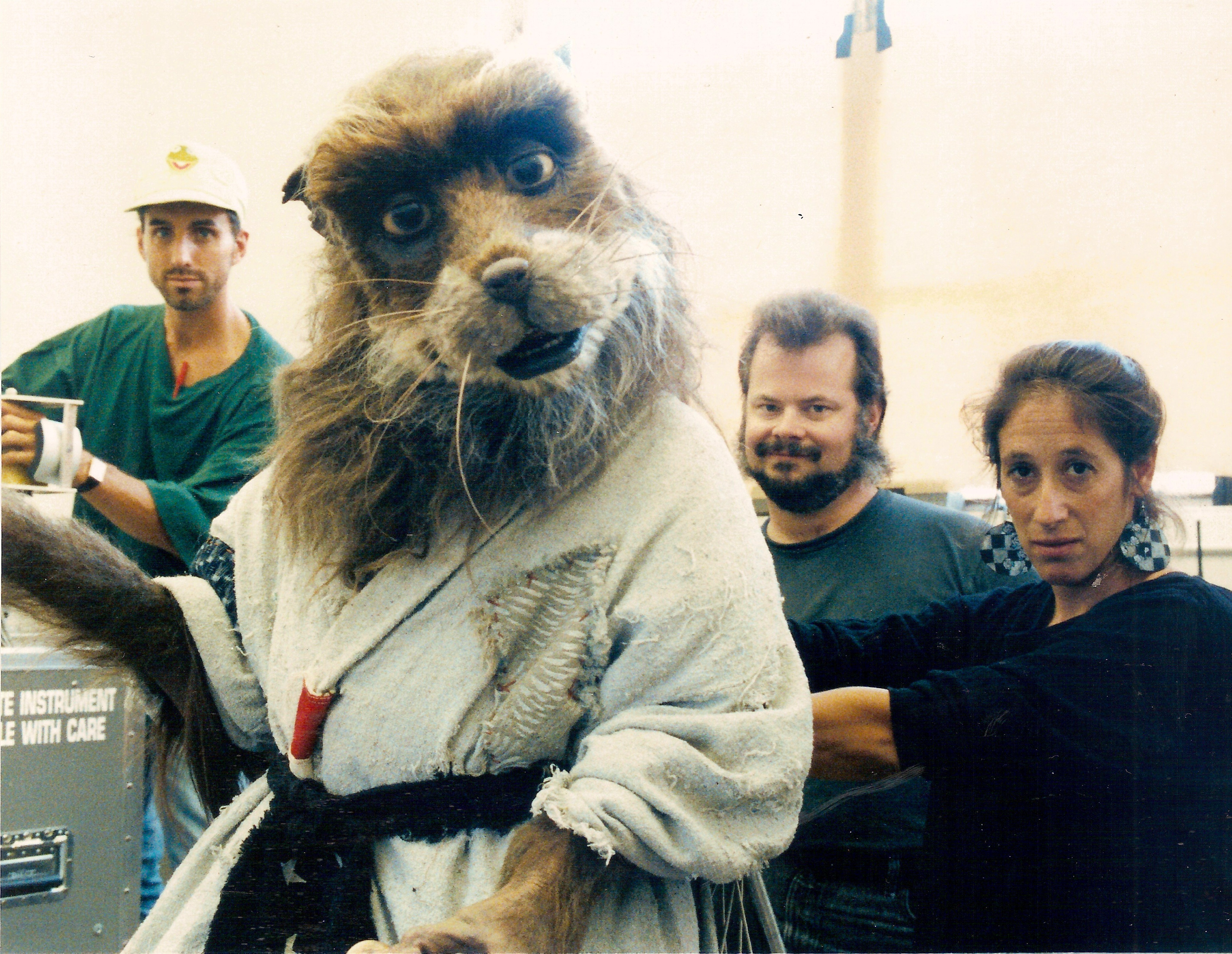
Sturz working with fellow puppeteers on the set of Teenage Mutant Ninja Turtles III

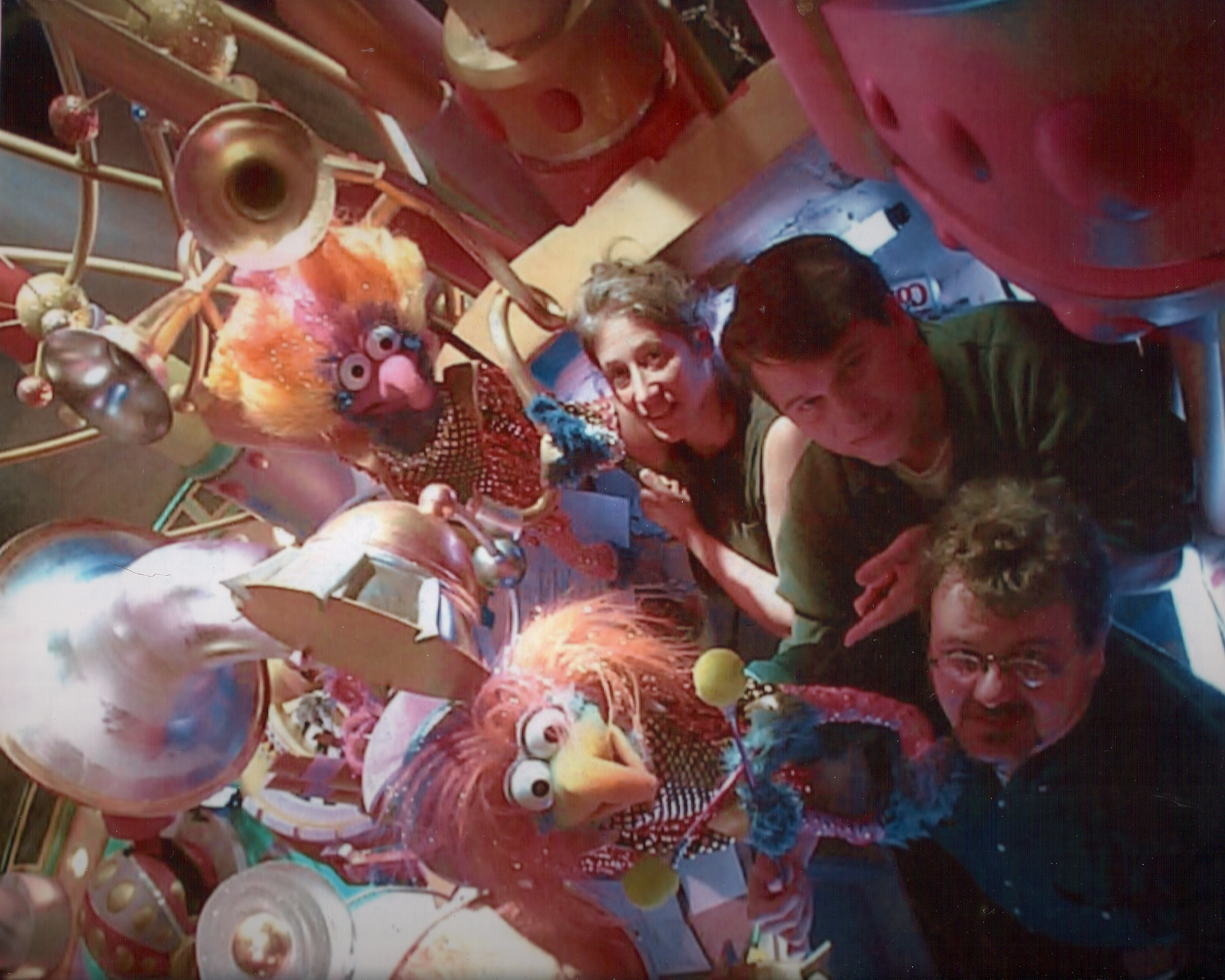
Sturz with fellow puppeteers on the set of Muppets from Space

Year	Project	Role	Hiring studio
1984	The Muppets Take Manhattan	Muppet crowd scenes	Jim Henson Productions
1985	Captain EO	Hooter, Geex	Lucasfilm
1986	Howard the Duck	Howard's hands	Industrial Light and Magic
1987	D.C. Follies	Puppeteer, puppet builder	Sid & Marty Krofft
1987	59th Annual Academy Awards	Audrey II for Little Shop of Horrors	The Samuel Goldwyn Company
1988	The Absent-Minded Professor	Food marionettes	Walt Disney Television
1988	Who Framed Roger Rabbit	Brooms motion capture	Touchstone, Amblin
1989	Gremlins 2: The New Batch	Background movement	Rick Baker Effects
1989	RoboCop 2	Cain robot monster movement	Phil Tippett Studio
1990	Muppet*Vision 3D	Background, additional muppet performer	Jim Henson Productions
1990	Teenage Mutant Ninja Turtles III	Splinter's hands animatronics	Golden Harvest, All Effects
1987-1990	Animal Crack-Ups	Reggie the Hedgie performer	ABC Prod., Vin Di Bona Prod.
1991	Puppet Master III: Toulon's Revenge	Stop motion puppet effects	David Allen Productions
1992	Batman Returns	Penguin puppet performer	Stan Winston Effects
1992	Land of I	Gabriel puppet performer	TLC is Creative, Images in Motion
1993	Fire in the Sky	Puppet rigging	Industrial Light and Magic
1993	Murphy Brown: "It's Not Easy Being Brown". Sutrz performance starts at 15:50	Murphy Brown Bear puppet voice and movement. 1992 Emmy for Outstanding Comedy Series.	Warner Bros., CBS
1994	The Flintstones	Brontosaurus puppeteer	Universal Pictures
1994	The Puzzle Place	Assistant puppeteer	KCET
1994	Pigasso's Place	Puppet designer and builder, Snail, Gabby, Tommy puppeteer	The Kushner-Locke Company
1995	Geo Kids	Principal puppeteer	National Geographic, Lost Kitty
1995	U to U: On the Road	Shoe puppeteer	Nickelodeon
1996	Shrek	Motion capture film test puppeteer	DreamWorks Animation
1996	Wee Singdom: The Land of Music and Fun	Puppet builder, Rose Cello puppeteer	MCA/Universal Home Video
1998	The Adventures of Elmo in Grouchland	Additional muppet performer: Oscar's left hand	Jim Henson Productions
1999	Muppets from Space	Additional muppet performer	Jim Henson Productions
2007	Trading Spouses: Cramer/Manavit-Sturz	Reality TV episode where Sturz swaps with wife from a Chicago family for a week.	Rocket Science Laboratories

=== Opera ===
Sturz was puppet master for two opera productions: The Ring Cycle and The Magic Flute.

==== Ring Cycle for Lyric Opera of Chicago (1995, 1996, 2003, 2005, 2006) ====
Sturz directing Das Rheingold puppeteers to transform Alberich into a Dragon

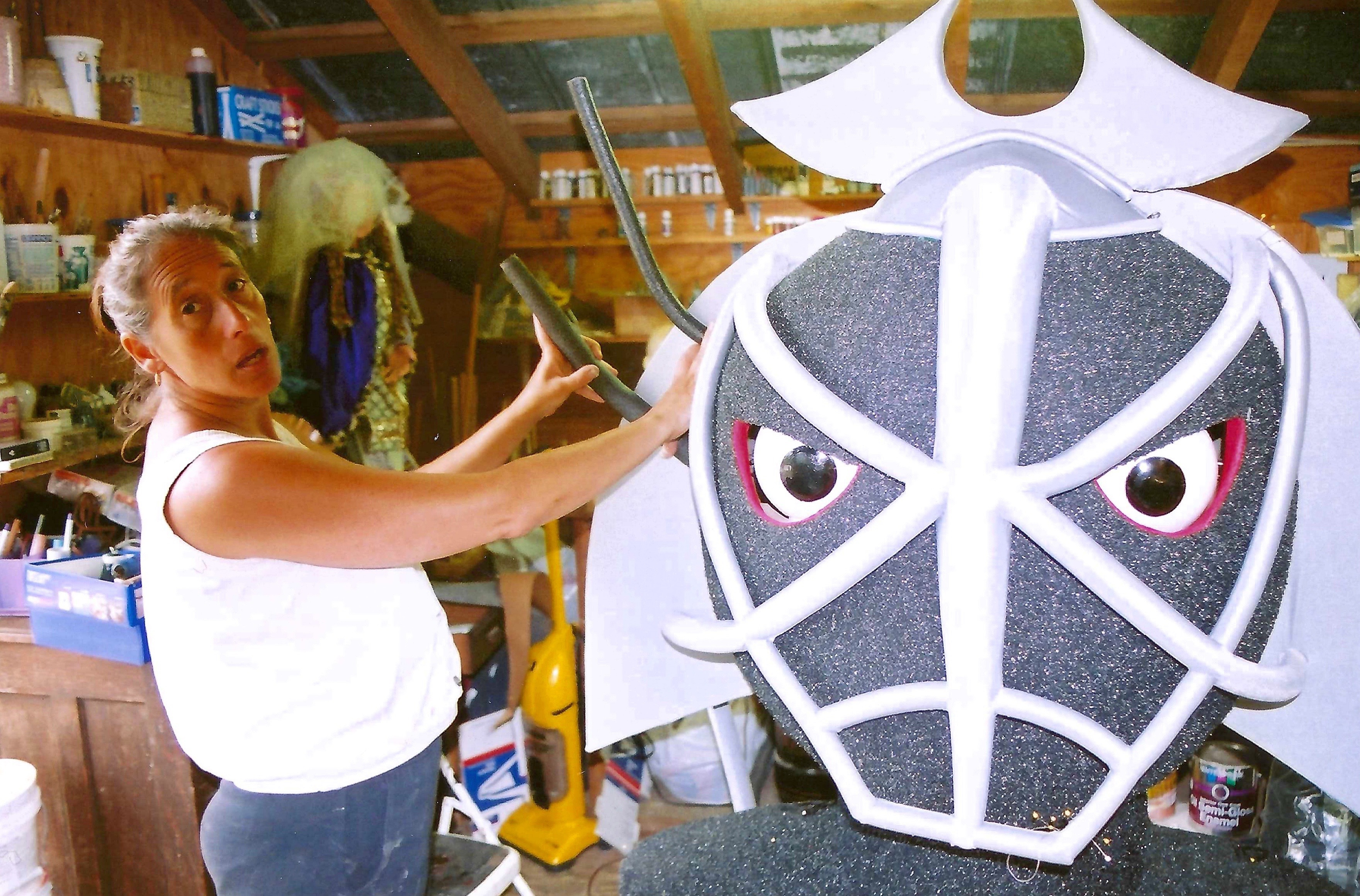
Sturz building Fafner for the Lyric in her Fairview studio

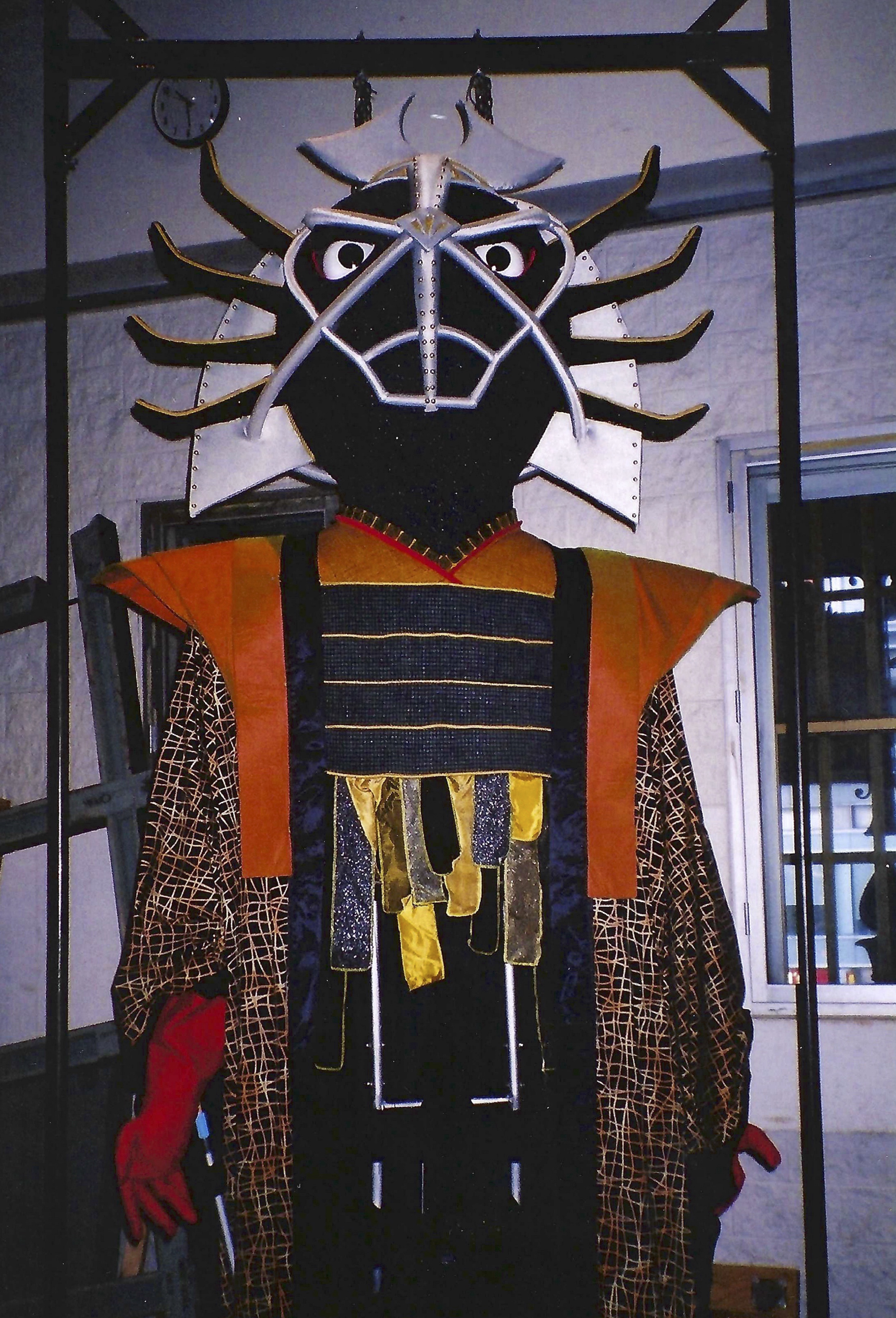
Sturz's Fafner puppet in the prop room.

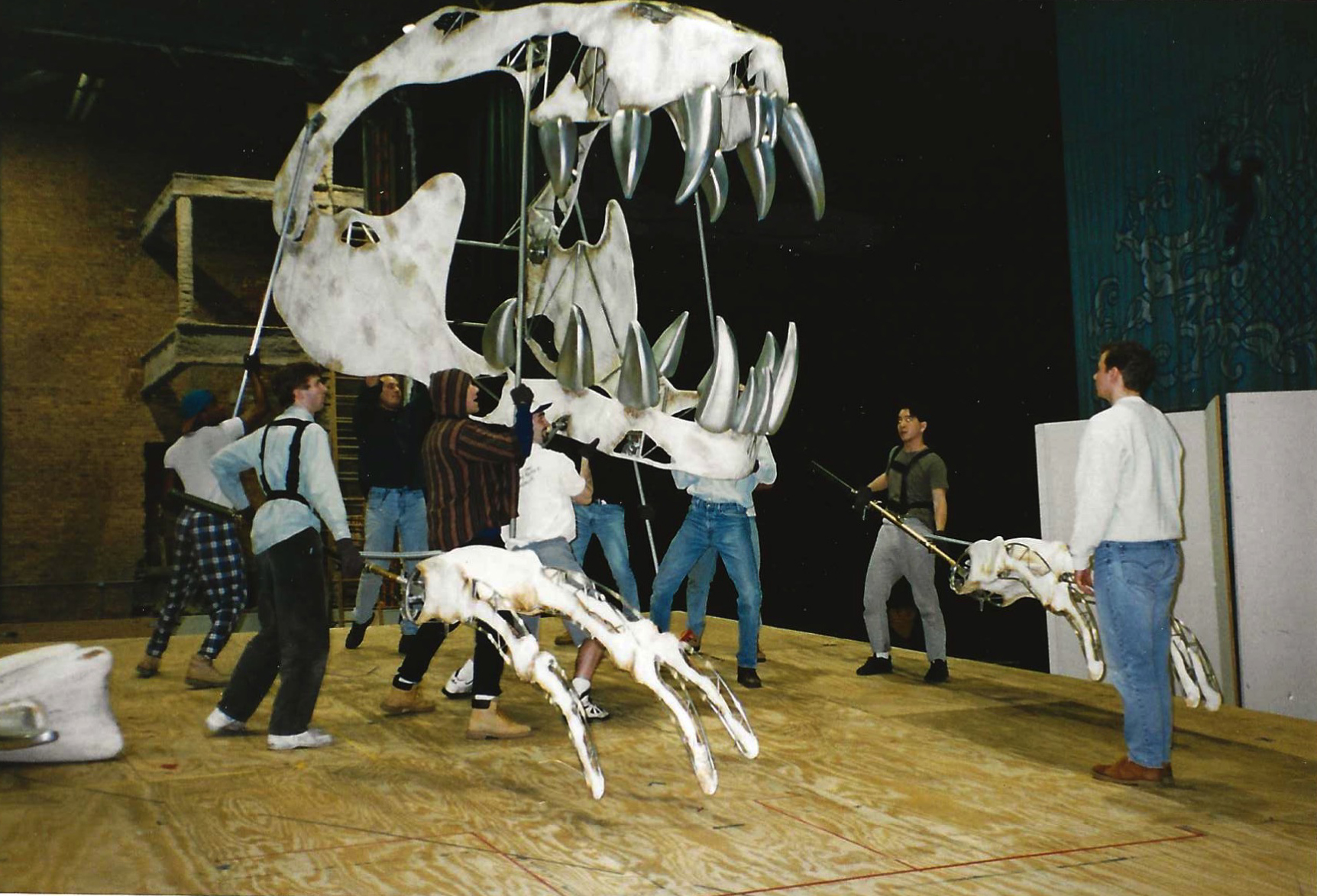
Sturz directing Siegfried puppeteers during a rehearsal

Wagner's Ring Cycle has four parts: Das Rheingold, Die Walküre, Siegfried, and Götterdämmerung. The Lyric Opera of Chicago mounted Das Rheingold in January and February of 1993 with Lyric debut appearances for conductor Zubin Mehta and choreographer Debra Brown. In 1994, Brown saw an opportunity to add enhanced puppet sequences for the upcoming Siegfried production in January and February of 1995. Brown knew Sturz from prior joint projects, and recommended that Sturz consult with John Conklin (set and costume design) on the mock-up of the Siegfried dragon. Her concepts were accepted and she was credited for her Lyric debut in 1995 as puppet master.

The Lyric Opera of Chicago began full performances (all four parts, 15 hours across multiple days) of The Ring Cycle on March 11, 1996 (its 41st season). Sturz continued to be retained as puppet master. It was the first time a full Cycle was presented within a year in Chicago since before WWII. All three 1996 Cycles (a total of 12 performances) were sold out months in advance.

As puppet master, Sturz staged all puppet performances in Das Rheingold and Siegfried. She also built some of the puppets and worked closely with Conklin in puppet design and with Brown in staging the woodbirds. Sturz introduced the blacklight approach for the Siegfried dragon in 2003 and 2005.

As told by Fred Putz: "Lisa's appointment as Puppetmaster came as a result of her previous association with Debra Brown (the choreographer from Cirque du Soleil), who had already created the Rhinemaidens swimming through the air on bungee cords and Valkyries leaping through the clouds with the help of trampolines. Debra recommended that Lisa consult with John Conklin (set and costume designer) on the mock-up of the dragon for "Seigfried." The Lyric was so pleased with her contributions that she was asked to stage the scene and was designated Puppetmaster."

In total, Sturz was the Lyric's puppet master for three Das Rheingold (1996, 2005, 2006) and four Siegfried (1995, 1996, 2003, 2005) productions. Her Ring contributions were reviewed in nine articles.

1. "Fafner the dragon is the most obvious design dilemma in Siegfried. The challenge is the same as the Ride of the Valkyries scene in Die Walküre and the swimming Rhine maidens who open Das Rheingold. Lyric's stage director, August Everding, and set designer John Conklin, along with lighting designer Duane Schuler, have to create visual images to match some of the world's most evocative music. They will be doing it with a puppet, a massive but lightweight aluminum skeleton that will fill Lyric's 50-foot-wide stage. Lisa Aimee Sturz is the puppet master in charge of the five-minute scene in which Siegfried slays Fafner and seizes the magic ring the dragon is guarding."
2. "Like the anvil scene, Siegfried's battle with Fafner is one of those places in which Wagner's dramatic music can overpower the stage action. Conklin and puppet master Lisa Aimee Sturz solved the problem superbly with a massive figure resembling a dinosaur skeleton. Manipulated by 16 black-clad handlers, Fafner was truly terrifying, with claws that loomed over Siegfried like the prehistoric beasts in Jurassic Park. The battle was exciting, with Siegfried being squeezed by the dragon's tail.
3. "Small wonder that much of the curiosity about the current production of Siegfried, seen in its fourth performance on Wednesday evening, was focused on the representation of the giant Fafner as dragon. And the contraption devised for the purpose by John Conklin, the set and costume designer, must have satisfied even the wildest expectations: a huge skeletal puppet consisting of segmented skull and tail, manipulated from below by 16 people. If the dragon did not steal the scene entirely, it was only because the dancer appended to the origami Forest Bird took a Peter Pan flight over the stage to close the second act."
4. "Lyric's Fafner, the creation of puppet master Lisa Aimee Sturz, is a gigantic reptilian skeleton requiring some 16 black-clad acrobats to manipulate its vertebrae and massive fanged jaws and head. The Woodbird is a simple origami bird held by a dancer who flies magically off like Peter Pan with Siegfried in pursuit. In Act 1, the furnishings of Mime's hut include a rocking-horse dragon which Siegfried rides from time to time. The bear episode is handled deftly, economically, and effectively."
5. "If the audience remembers anything about the visual design, it will be the bungee-jumping Rhinemaidens and trampoline-bounding Valkyries as choreographed by Debra Brown, also the oversized dragon and giant puppets by Lisa Aimee Sturz, striking creations all".
6. "Puppet master Lisa Aimee Sturz brings back her nifty dragon, a large skeletal Fafner with snapping steel jaws and mean-looking claws operated by black-clad supers".
7. "The success of Lyric's production of The Ring was due to the combination of Wagner's well-played music, imaginative set design, creative lighting, sophisticated choreography, and the magic of puppetry".
8. "One notable visual improvement is the Fafner scene. The Lyric's skeletal dragon created quite a stir when it debuted in the 1993-1994 season. Now, Fafner is more fearsome than ever, thanks to creative 'black' lighting and phosphorescent makeup, which helps to obscure the 15 black-costumed puppeteers (choreographed by Lisa Aimee Sturz) that bring the monster to life. It's a wonderful solution to one of the more problematic scenes to pull off convincingly in the Ring cycle."
9. "The theatrical puppeteer Lisa Aimee Sturz created the huge skull, the skeletal segmented tail, and giant talons, expertly manipulated in time to Wagner's music by sixteen people hidden underneath. I regret not having seen the actual performance but have studied the photographs and corresponded with Lisa."

==== The Magic Flute (2009-10, 2017-2018, 2024) ====
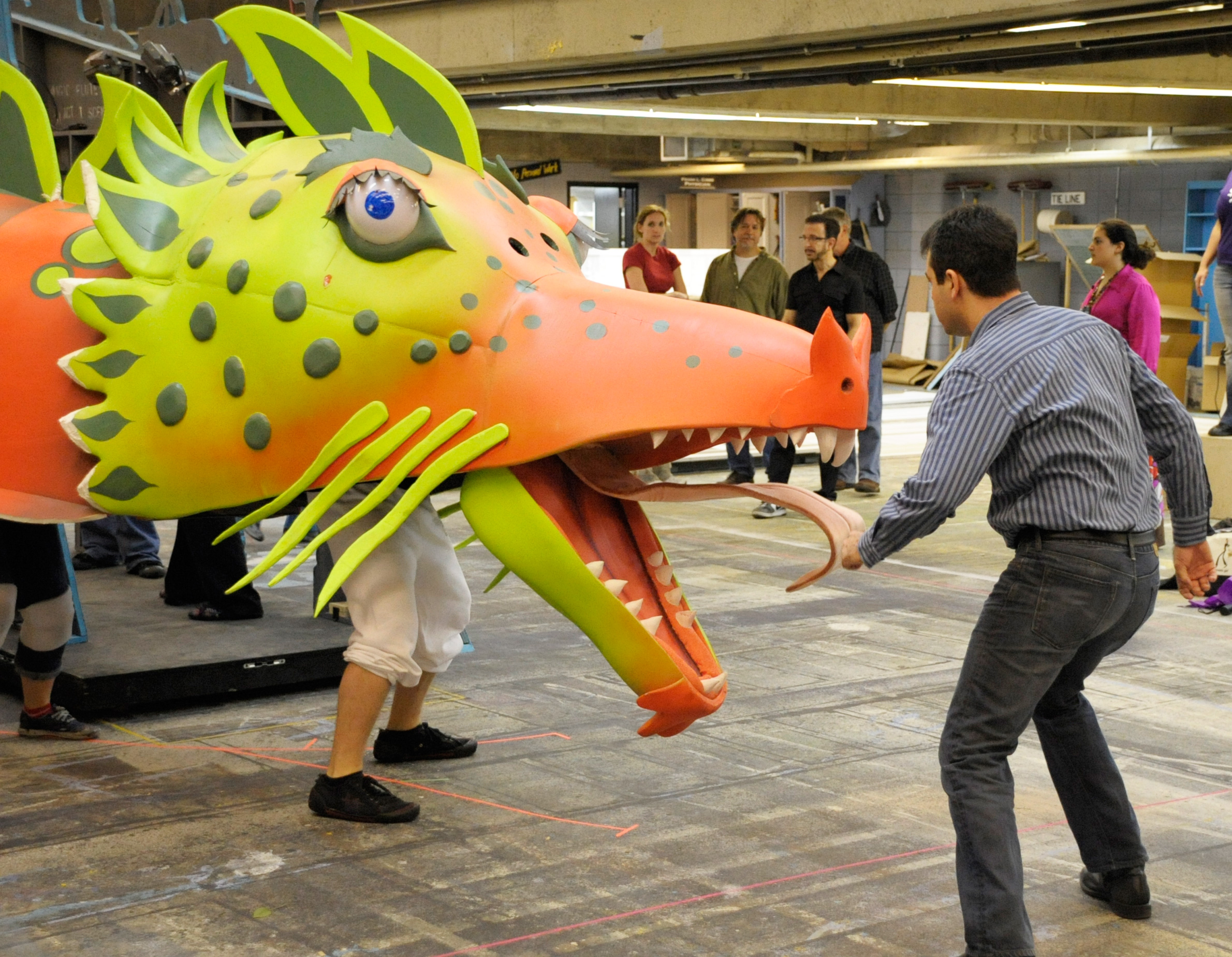
Director Tomer Zvulun reviews puppet master Sturz's new dragon and choreography during a 2009 Magic Flute rehearsal

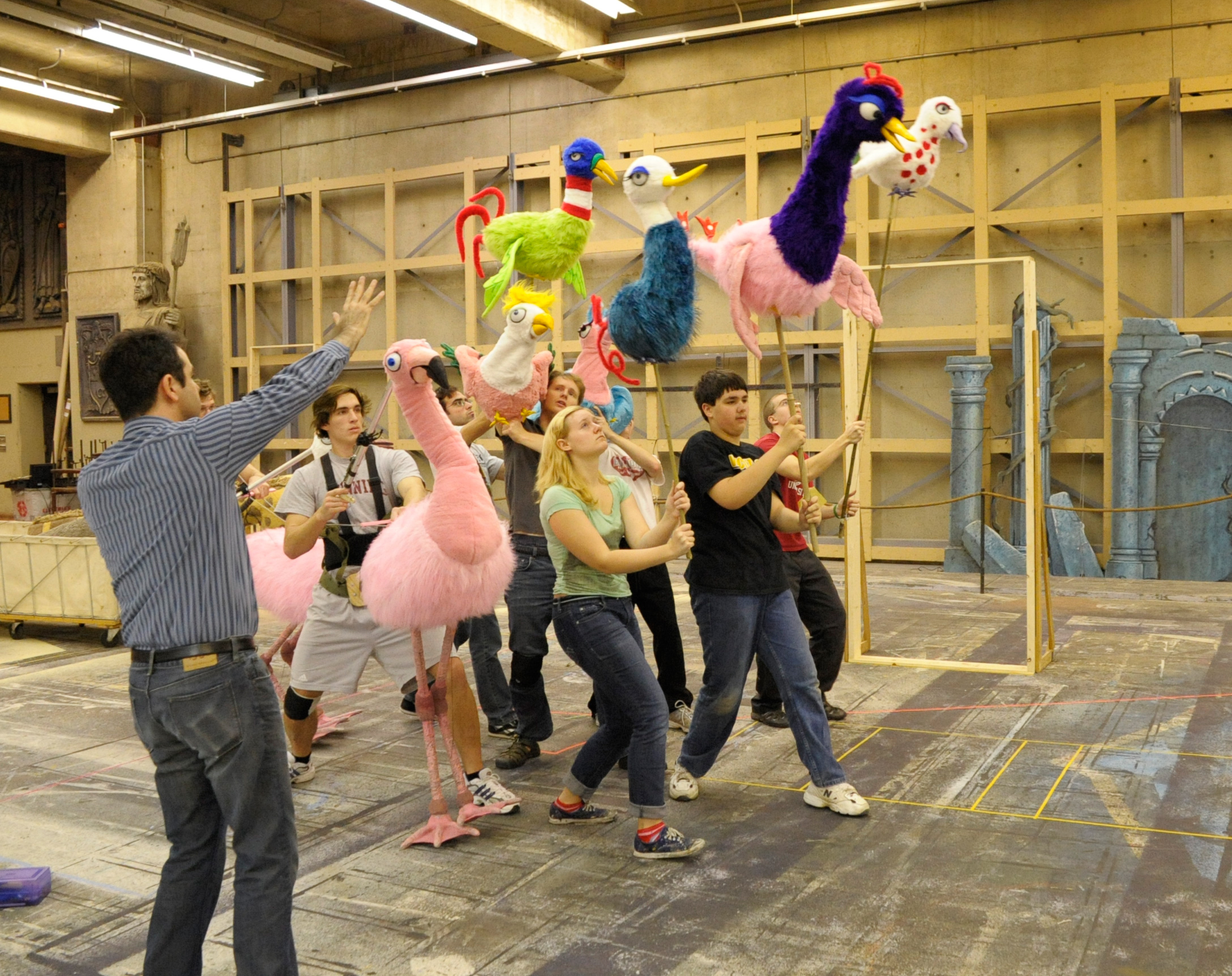
Zvulun reviews Sturz's bird puppets and choreography during a 2009 Magic Flute rehearsal

Sturz was puppet master for a co-production of The Magic Flute. It premiered at Indiana University Opera Theater's Musical Arts Center in Bloomington in November, 2009. The artistic team included conductor Mark Gibson, stage director Tomer Zvulun, and set and costume designer C. David Higgins. As puppet master, Sturz's Red Herring Puppets built and choreographed the puppets, then Sturz directed the puppeteering. A promotional video was posted on November 11, 2009, for the launch. It featured the artistic team, student performers, and the puppets Sturz built.

Arts reviewer George Walker reviewed the debut immediately afterward. (The currently available recording and transcript were published in 2019.) In the review he addressed Sturz's work:

One of the highlights of this production is the bird and animal puppets created by Lisa Sturz. They are wonderful whimsical creations and some of the best acting in the show comes from the feathered folk. They fly about, comment on the action, bill, coo, scrap and even eat out of the bird catcher's hand. Later the menagerie is expanded with a giraffe, a kinkajou and just the cutest little porcupine that you can imagine. Parents or grandparents who're looking for a first opera for a child might want to think about the first act of "The Magic Flute" as a wonderful introduction. The singing is in German, but the dialog and most of the humor is in English, it's very active and the puppets are great.

Peter Jacobi also reviewed the production: "And to help satisfy the fairy tale elements of the story, there's a huge and squiggly dragon. There are birds that nibble and peck. There are full-sized, huggable animals. All, of course, are make-believe and brought to life by puppeteers, these trained by an imported master of that craft, puppet creator Lisa Aimee Sturz."

The co-production then moved to the Atlanta Opera to conclude its 2009/2010 season with conductor Arthur Fagen, Zvulun and Higgins. A review of the Atlanta production by Pierre Ruhe references Sturz's dragon: "It helps, too, that they had a good dragon. Puppets are in vogue in theater and opera these days, and this Magic Flute, which premiered in Indiana in November, is wonderfully whimsical without being hollow -- a difficult balance."

Seven years later, Sturz's Magic Flute puppets were refurbished for the Atlanta Opera Studio Tour, which reaches 12,500 students a year. The Flute tour started in October 2017 and repeated in January and May 2018. All performances were fully booked. The Center for Puppetry Arts also hosted the Studio Tour's Magic Flute in January 2018.

The main stage production of The Magic Flute was mounted again by the Atlanta Opera in November 2024 with Fagen, Zvulun, and Higgins. Sturz is credited for the original puppets, and her refurbished bird puppets are featured in a playful promotional video for the production: Puppet Take-Over.

=== Symphony ===
Sturz has supported three symphony productions with puppetry: Petrushka, Pictures at an Exhibition and Peter and the Wolf.

==== Petrushka (2008) ====
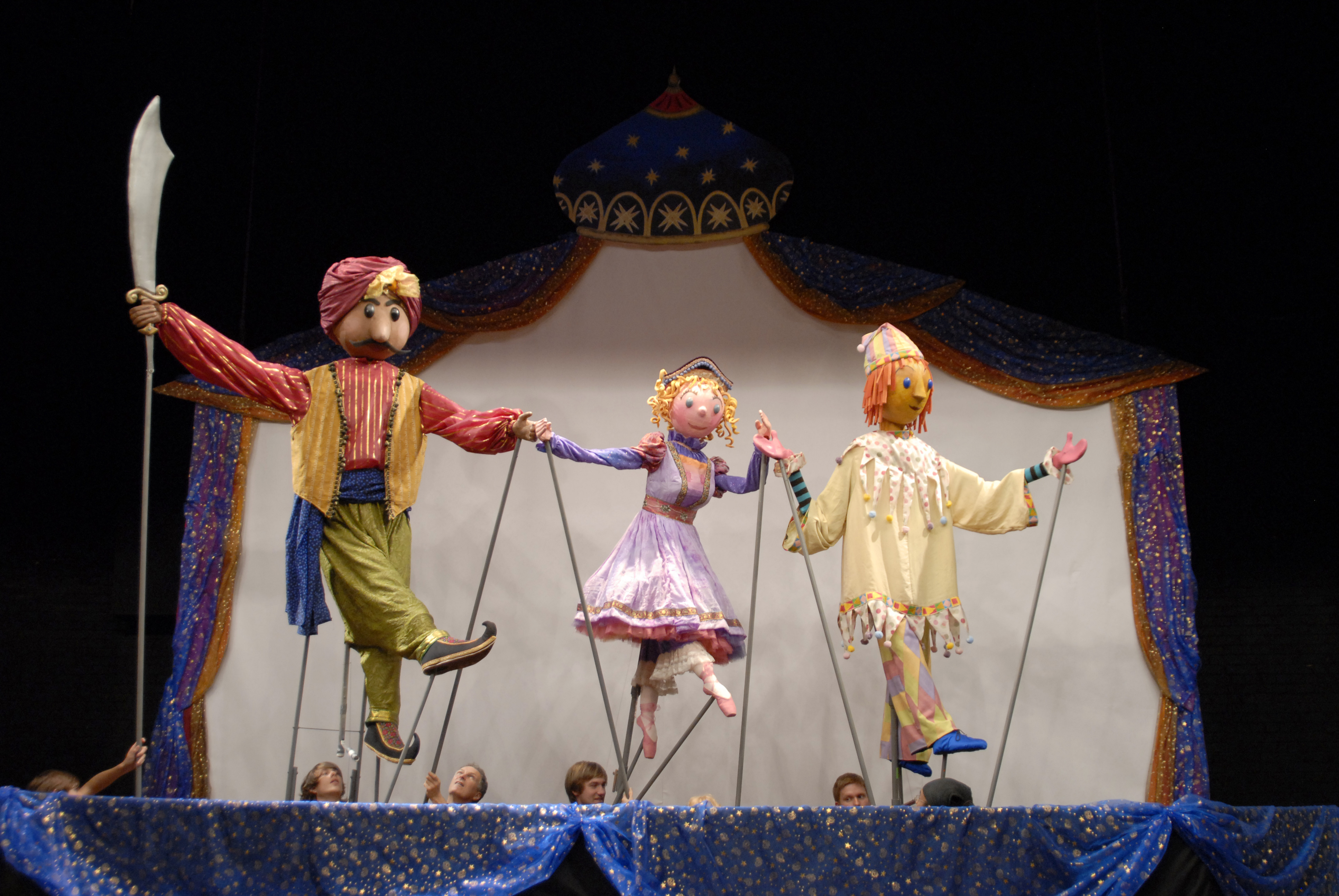
Petrushka puppets performing with the Asheville Symphony

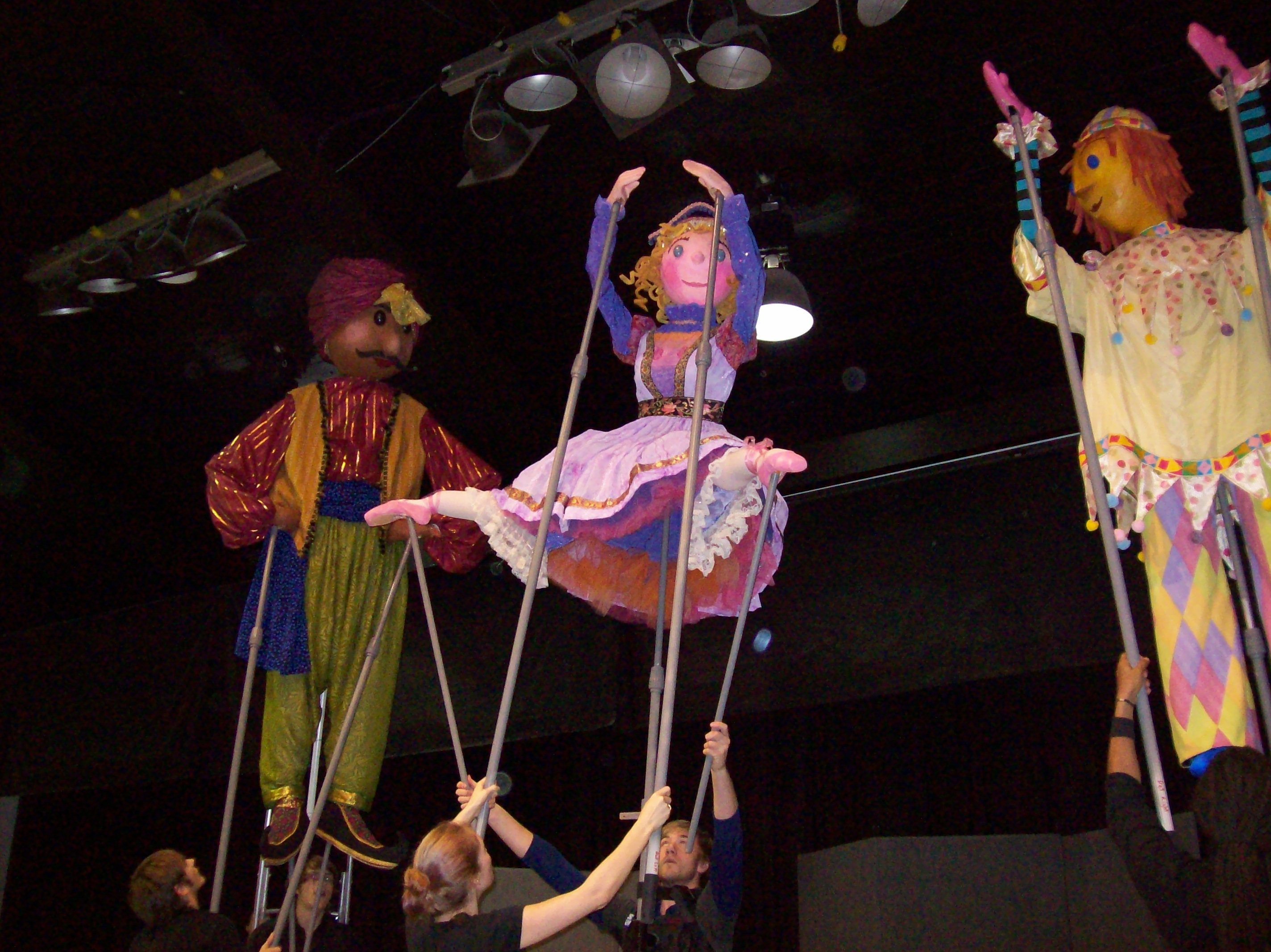
Petrushka puppeteers rehearse movements for Ballerina jump

Sturz collaborated with the Asheville Symphony Orchestra to produce Petrushka on May 10, 2008, for their final Masterworks concert of the season. Music director Daniel Meyer decided to present Petrushka, a ballet about puppets, in the 2007–2008 season, and executive director Steve Hageman brought in Sturz to collaborate with Meyer. A behind-the-scenes and pre-show video of the co-production was published.

Stravinsky's Petrushka has four central characters: Petrushka the clown, the Ballerina (who is loved by Petrushka), the Moor (to whom the Ballerina is attracted), and the Magician who brings the puppets to life. Sturz's proposal was for conductor Meyer to play the Magician, use ten-foot rod puppets for the other three central puppets, and use projectors for background scenes and to present additional puppets.

The concept was accepted and Sturz's Red Herring Puppets built the puppets and background projections. Sturz was interviewed by Hageman for the season program and described her vision for the production:

The unique challenge with Petrushka has been sharing the stage with a full orchestra. Stravinsky's music is the driving force and the visuals must not compete with the energy and excitement of the score. I observed Daniel Meyer conducting at previous symphonic concerts and couldn't take my eyes off him. I knew his charismatic presence had to be part of the drama. I asked Daniel to double as the magician with the orchestra as the source of the magic and the spirit of the crowd as the Shrovetide Fair.

Sturz's puppetry team included a specialist in Russian ballet (Susan Paul) to help with choreography and a musical coordinator (Gwenn Roberts) to coach the team on moving to the score. The three rod puppets were performed by six puppeteers. Additional puppeteers performed the shadow puppets projected on a screen behind the rod puppets and orchestra. Gwenn Roberts also performed as a real-time shadow puppet imitating conductor Meyer as the Magician.

The 2008 Petrushka production was referenced multiple times in Asheville Symphony's 50th Anniversary publication celebrating past productions.

==== Pictures at an Exhibition (2009) ====
Pictures at an Exhibition was performed at the Keith-Albee Performing Arts Center by the Huntington Symphony Orchestra on October 25, 2009. Sturz designed, built, choreographed shadow puppets performed on overhead projectors, and trained four puppeteers for the performance. In 2017, Sturz remounted the production for a performance at the Diana Wortham Theater with John Cobb performing the score on piano.

==== Peter and the Wolf (2012) ====
Peter and the Wolf was performed in March, 2012 at the Birmingham Children's Theatre. Forty-four members of the Alabama Symphony Orchestra accompanied the production. Dane Peterson was director and Fawzi Haimor was conductor. Sturz designed and built six four-foot tall rod puppets and eight puppeteers were trained by Sturz to perform them.

=== Theater ===
Year	Production	Role	Company
1981	Uncle Za'rour	Creative Director, puppet master. Work with local community. Identify folk characters. Tour rural villages throughout Jordan.	Haya Cultural Center
1987	Little Shop of Horrors	Build and perform four distinct Audrey II puppets as the plant grew in size.	La Mirada Theater
1987	PH*reaks	Design and build puppet characters. Train puppeteers.	Mark Tapper Forum
1989	Pirandello's Wife	Design set, costumes, and makeup	California Polytechnic State University, San Luis Obispo theater and dance
1989	The Book and the Stranger	Design and build shadow puppets for New York production	La MaMa Experimental Theatre Club
1990	25th Anniversary Celebration	Worked for Julie Taymor as puppet performer, choreographer, and restorer	Los Angeles Music Center
1992	Terra Firma	Puppet master	Mark Taper Forum
1993	The Hand Behind the Face	Design, create, and perform skeletal puppets	Odyssey Theater
1993	Romeo and Juliet	Design and build portable puppet stage and puppets. Perform prologue.	Los Angeles Women's Shakespeare Company
1995	The Puppetmaster of Lodz	Design and build marionettes. Train actor to manipulate them.	Actors Alley Repertory Theater
1997	Lulu Noire	Design and perform 6-foot marionette of lead tenor with 40-foot long strings.	Spoleto Festival
1997	In Xanadu	Perform shadow puppets on overhead projector.	ShadowLight Productions
2001	A Wrinkle in Time	Design and build visual effects including the "brain." Perform role of Aunt Beast.	NC Stage Company
2003	Fiddler on the Roof	Design and build giant puppets for nightmare sequence. Perform role of Yenta.	Asheville Theater Company
2004	Beauty and the Beast	Build teapot, wardrobe, candlestick and other costumes.	Flat Rock Playhouse
2005	The Long Christmas Ride Home	Design and Build three bunraku figures resembling the three main actors.	Actor's Express
2016	Young Frankenstein	Build 12-foot Frankenstein puppet and train puppeteers.	Asheville Community Theater
2017	30th Anniversary Concert	Design, build, and choreograph musical sequence for African Yemaha ocean goddess.	Womansong of Asheville
2022	Emergency	Paint scenery. Build life-size skeleton puppet.	Invisible Theater
2024	Alibrejes	Build three 4-foot marionettes for blacklight stage. Puppet master.	Borderlands Theater, Scoundrel and Scamp Theater
2025	Macbeth	Design and build shadow puppet sequence.	Scoundrel and Scamp Theater

=== My Grandfather's Prayers ===
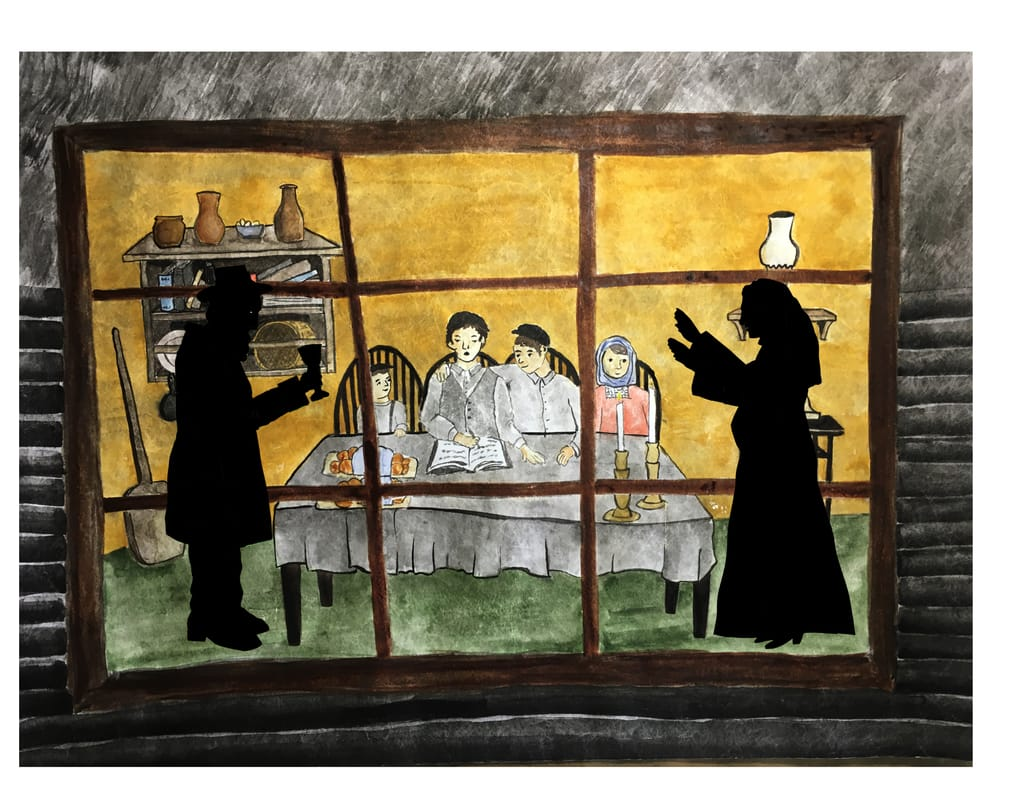
Shadow puppet Sabbath scene from My Grandfather's Prayers.

Sturz co-produced and created a movie with JLTV: My Grandfather's Prayers. It was recorded at JLTV studios in Los Angeles and aired internationally. The film is a multi-media theatrical performance based on the life of Izso Glickstein, a fourth-generation cantor, child prodigy, and operatic tenor. Background research included visiting officials at the Dohany Street Synagogue in Budapest. One recalled Glickstein and pointed Sturz to the National Archives of Hungary. Sturz also visited Congregation Mishkan Tefila and reviewed their Glickstein archives.

Sturz used shadow puppets, scrolling backgrounds, marionettes, digital compositing, and rhyme to explore her own ancestry, artistry, spirituality, and social responsibility. Two solo klezmer fiddle tracks by Michael Levy from Echoes of the Shtetl were used.

Before making the film, Sturz created a touring puppet show. Theater professional and documentary filmmaker Rebecca Williams was consulting director. The tour included Asheville, Cleveland, Iowa, Minneapolis, Cleveland, Boston, New York, and Tucson. At the Midwest Regional Puppeteers of America Festival in Iowa, the show was reviewed in the local newspaper: Puppeteer Lisa Sturz tells the story of her grandfather's life ... This was not a story to entertain children, and seeing the show was an experience much like seeing an Oscar-winning drama.

Before it was performed in Asheville, a description of the production was published in a local magazine. Then an interview with Sturz was published by Blue Ridge Public Radio about her background and the touring show. Another segment of the tour was in Tucson, and a five-and-a-half minute segment about the film was aired on Tucson's ABC affiliate KGUN-TV. Sturz described how Glickstein's music inspired her to make the film.

The film premiered on JLTV, January 25, 2020. Just before it aired, a detailed interview with Sturz was published on Arizona Jewish Post. It described Glickstein's journey as a cantor, first in Europe, then in Boston. It also reviews Sturz's career. Later, the film was described by Sturz in an article.

The film won a Telly Award and a DeRose-Hinkhouse Award, both in 2021.

=== Media ===
Four videos about Sturz's work have been published:

1. From Arizona Public Media (AZPM), produced by Özlem Özgür
2. From PBS for the show Arizona Illustrated (Sturz segments: 0:04-0:20, 4:28-14:50)
3. From AARP and Art State Arizona for a mini-documentary series Through the Artist's Eyes
4. From Ink & Staples in a mini-documentary Keeping the Art of Puppetry Alive | Lisa Sturz

A two-minute version of the AZPM video on Sturz was published for State of the ArtZ 101 (Sturz segment: 8:16-10:10). A 53-minute radio interview with Sturz was published on the talk show Tucson Business Radio X. She was also interviewed for five minutes on TV about her movie My Grandfather's Prayers on Tucson's ABC affiliate. Print articles about Sturz are summarized toward the end of this page (see: #Articles About Sturz).

== Red Herring Puppets ==
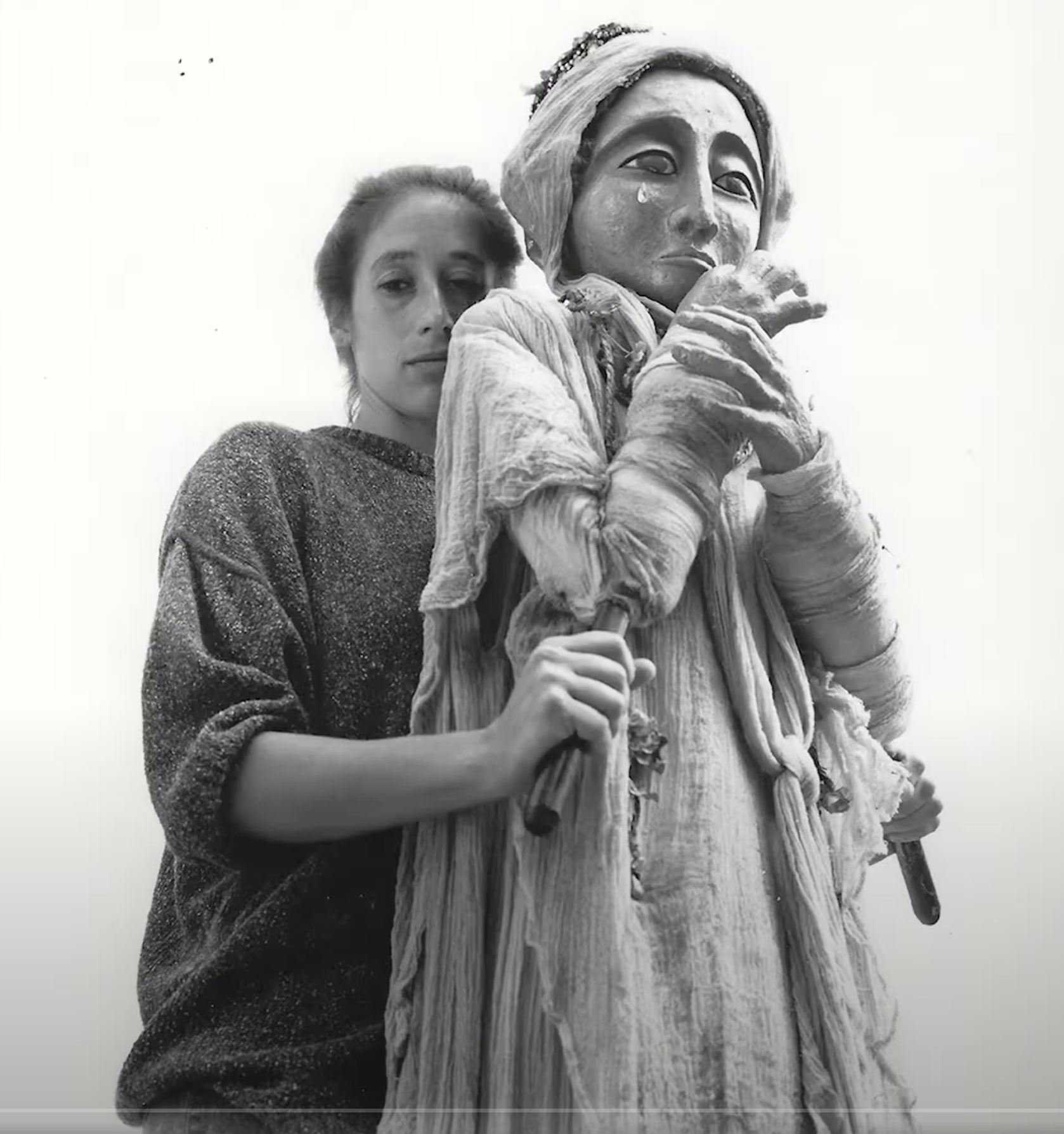
Sturz with Eros and Psyche puppet

Sturz founded Red Herring Puppets in 1988. It provides puppet performances, puppet builds, and education. The company has toured over 20 puppet shows created by Sturz. About half of them were based on legends, fables, history, and science. The others are original Sturz creations. Three were mounted for national fall-to-spring tours. Recently, Sturz produced bilingual shows in Spanish and English. Several Red Herring Puppets shows still toured at schools, libraries, and theaters in 2025.

Sturz's process for creating a show was: research; storyboarding; script writing (often in rhyme); puppet design and building; portable stage and scenery design and building (to fit in a mini-van); sourcing music and voice talent; sound recording and mixing; sourcing puppeteer talent; training and rehearsing puppeteers; marketing (including article writing, participating in newspaper and TV interviews, etc.); securing grants, venues, and performance commitments; show logistics; and billing and accounting.

Sturz served as adjunct professor at Warren Wilson College in 2015 and taught a course on puppet slams, ending with a performance at White Horse Black Mountain. Sturz is also an educator through classroom artist-in-residence programs (or residencies). Starting in 2023, Red Herring Puppets' home venue has been the Scoundrel and Scamp Theater, where Sturz is an artistic associate along with Wolfe Bowart.

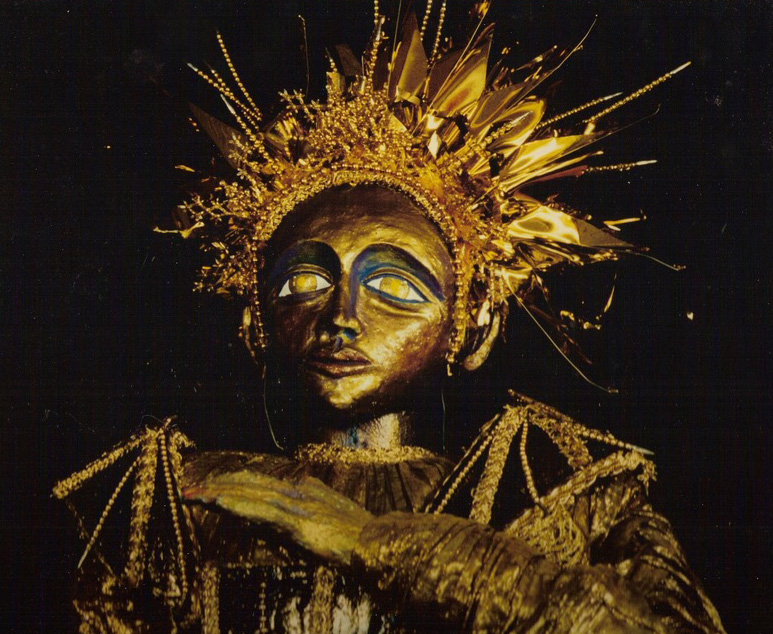
Apollo for Eros and Psyche production

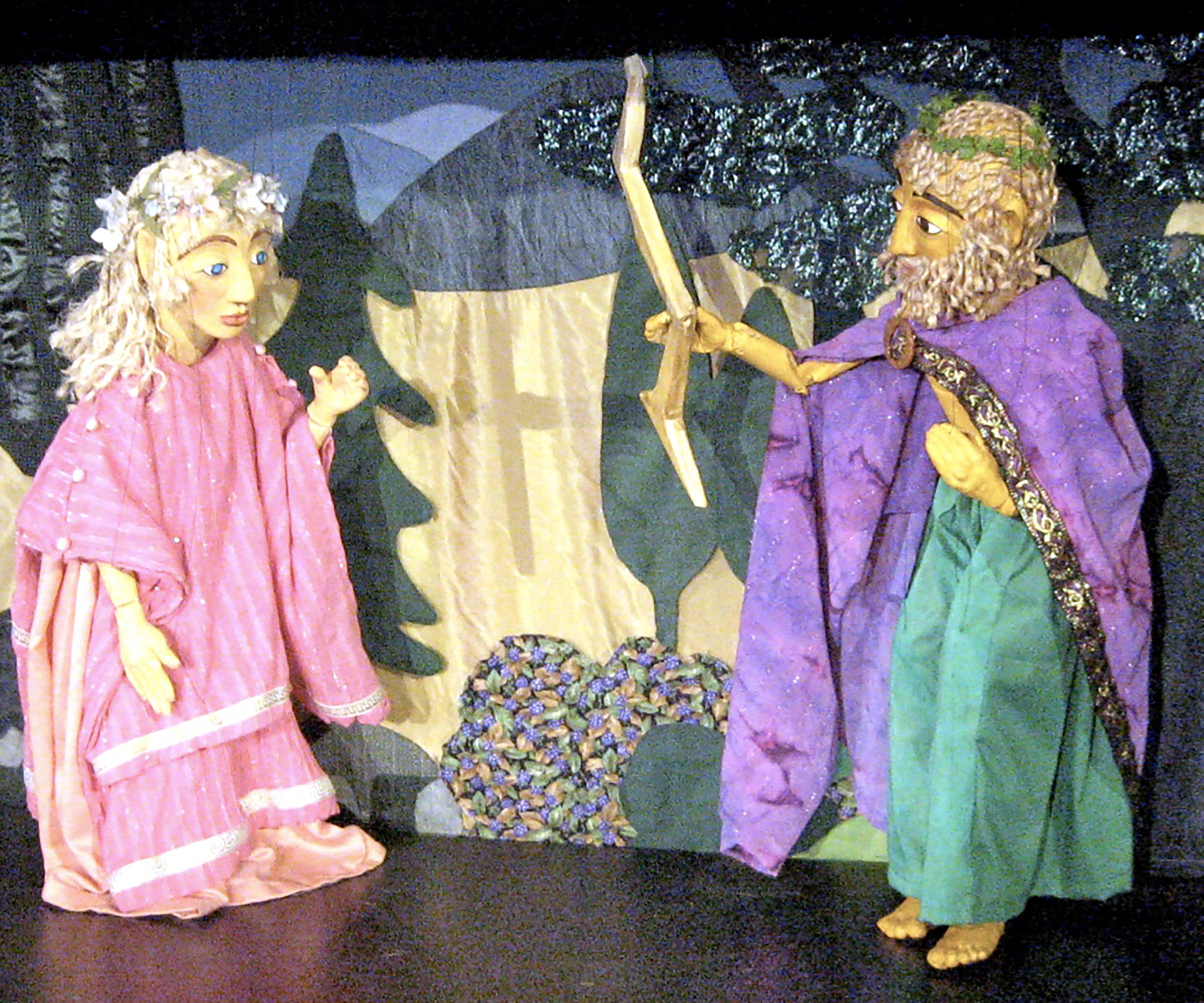
Callistro and Zeus from the puppet show The Big Dipper

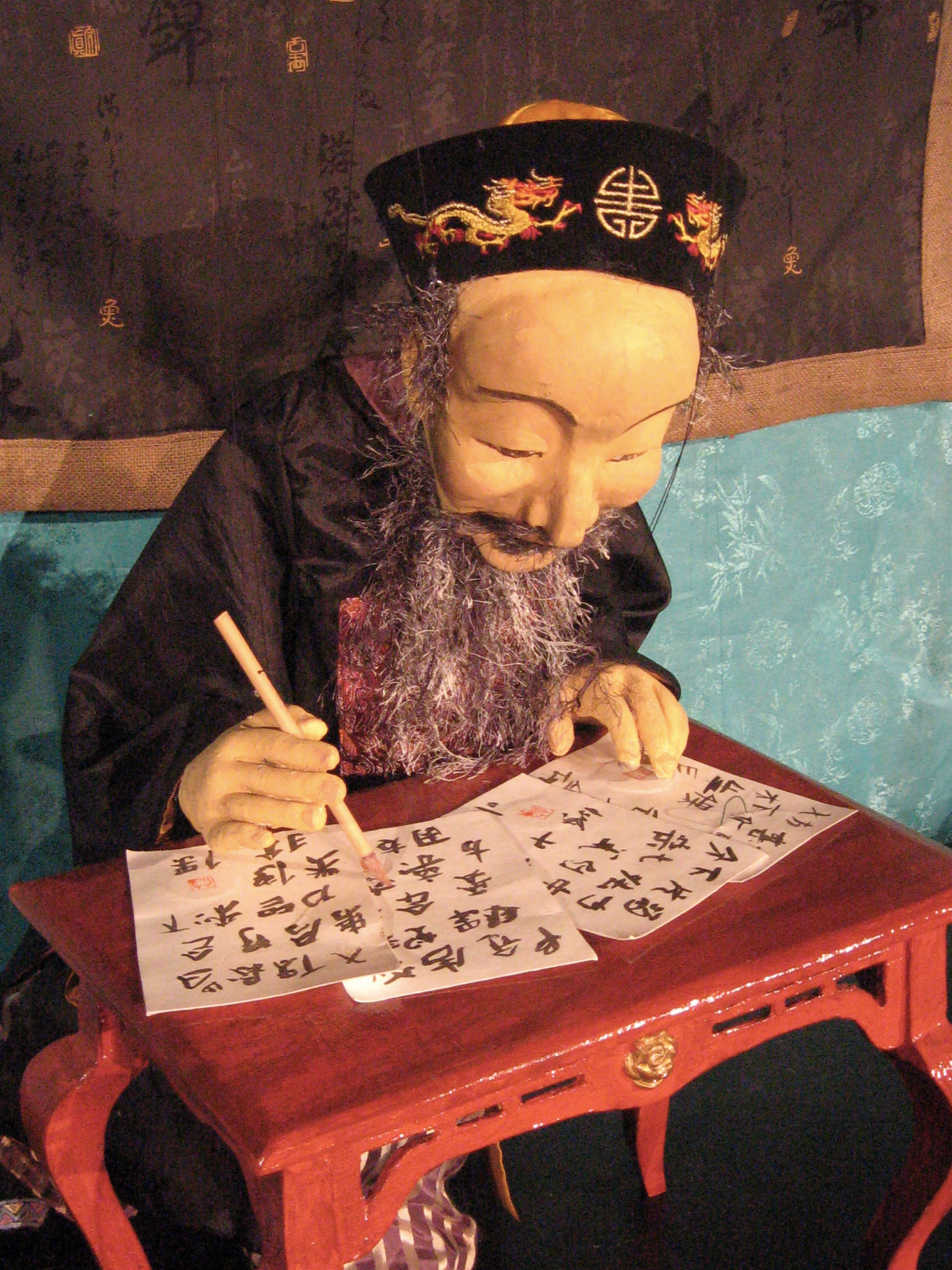
Loshi writing Chinese characters in the puppet show The Big Dipper

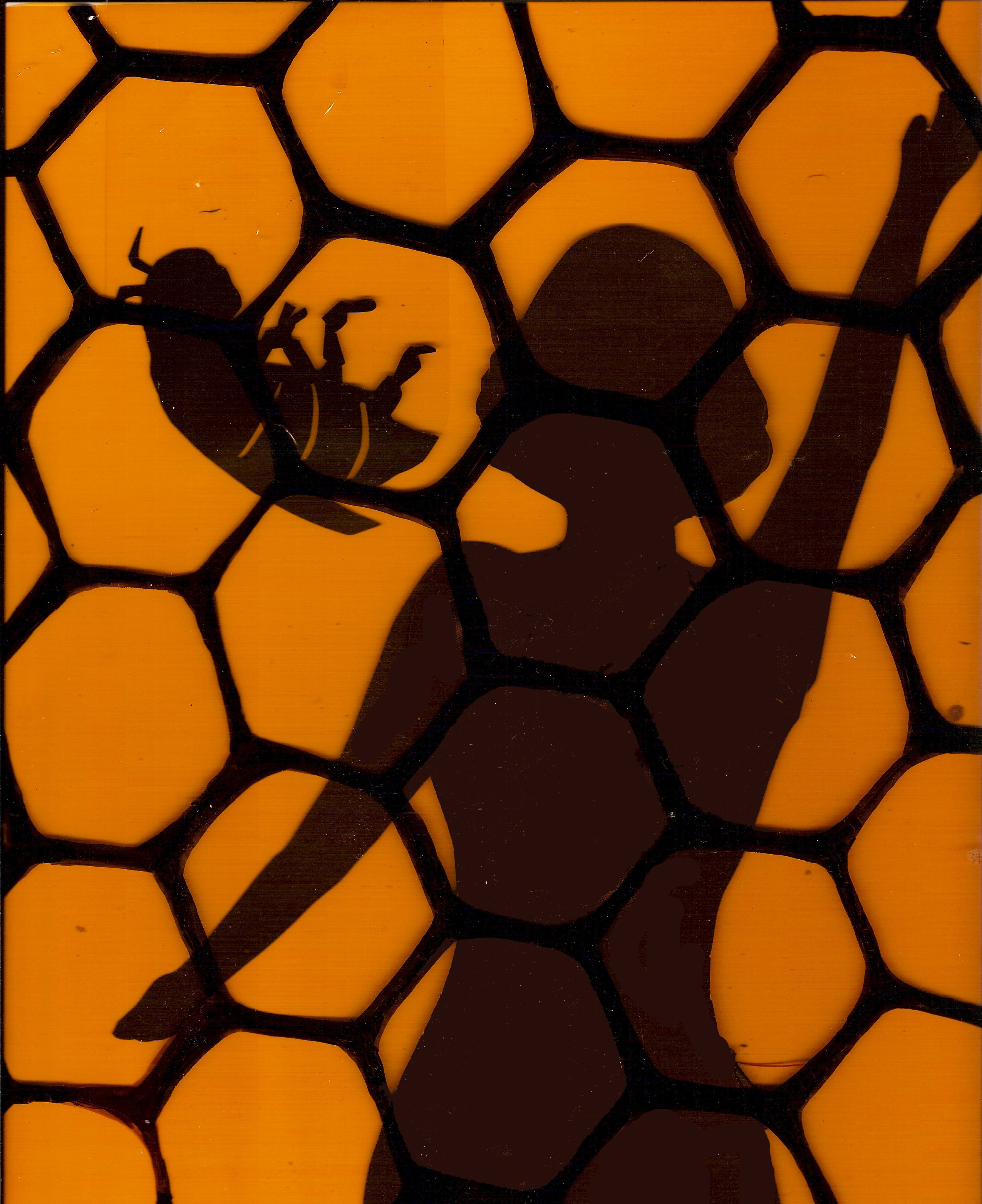
BeeSting, shadow puppets about the hive, the declining bee population, and breast cancer

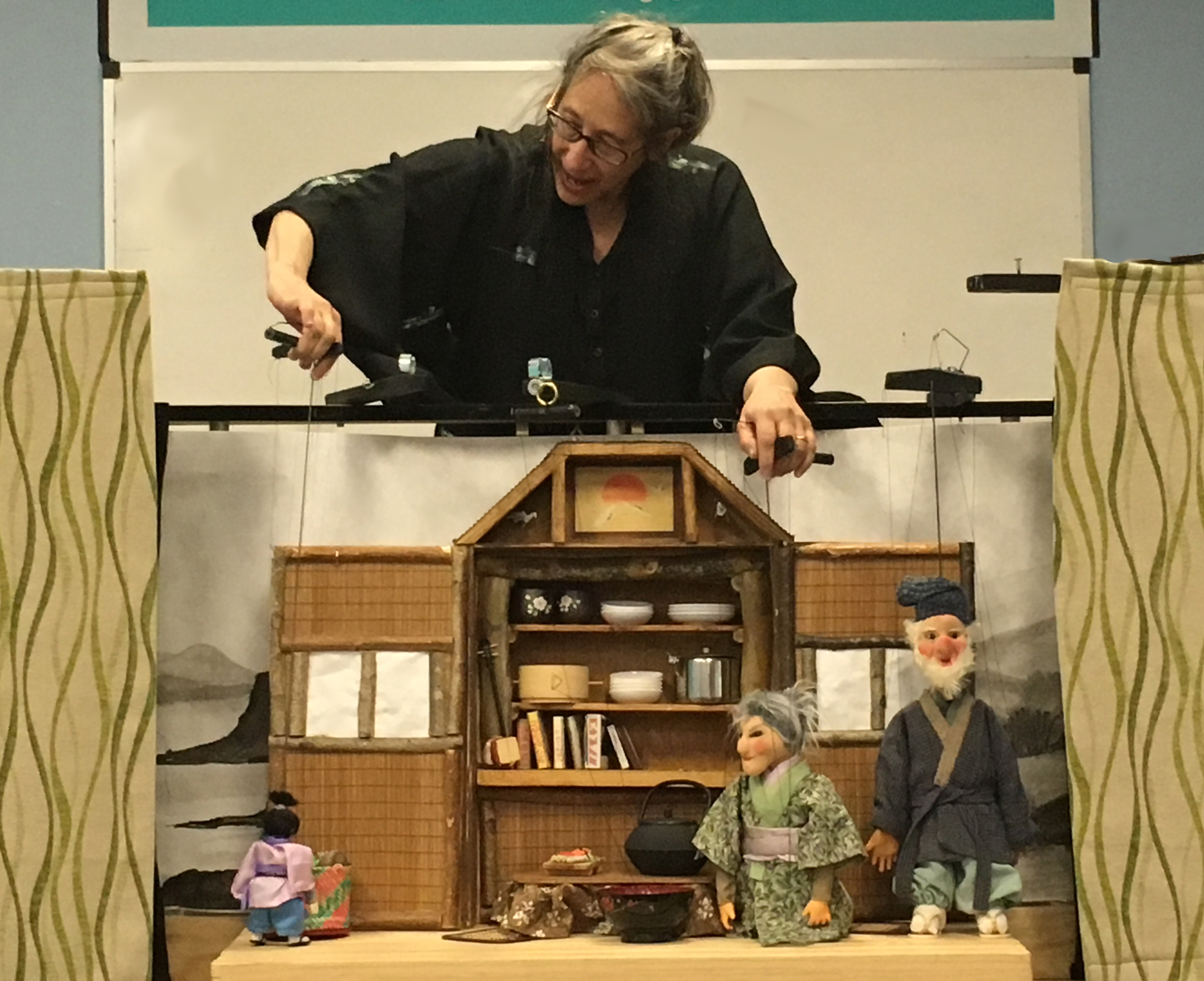
Sturz performing Little One Inch.

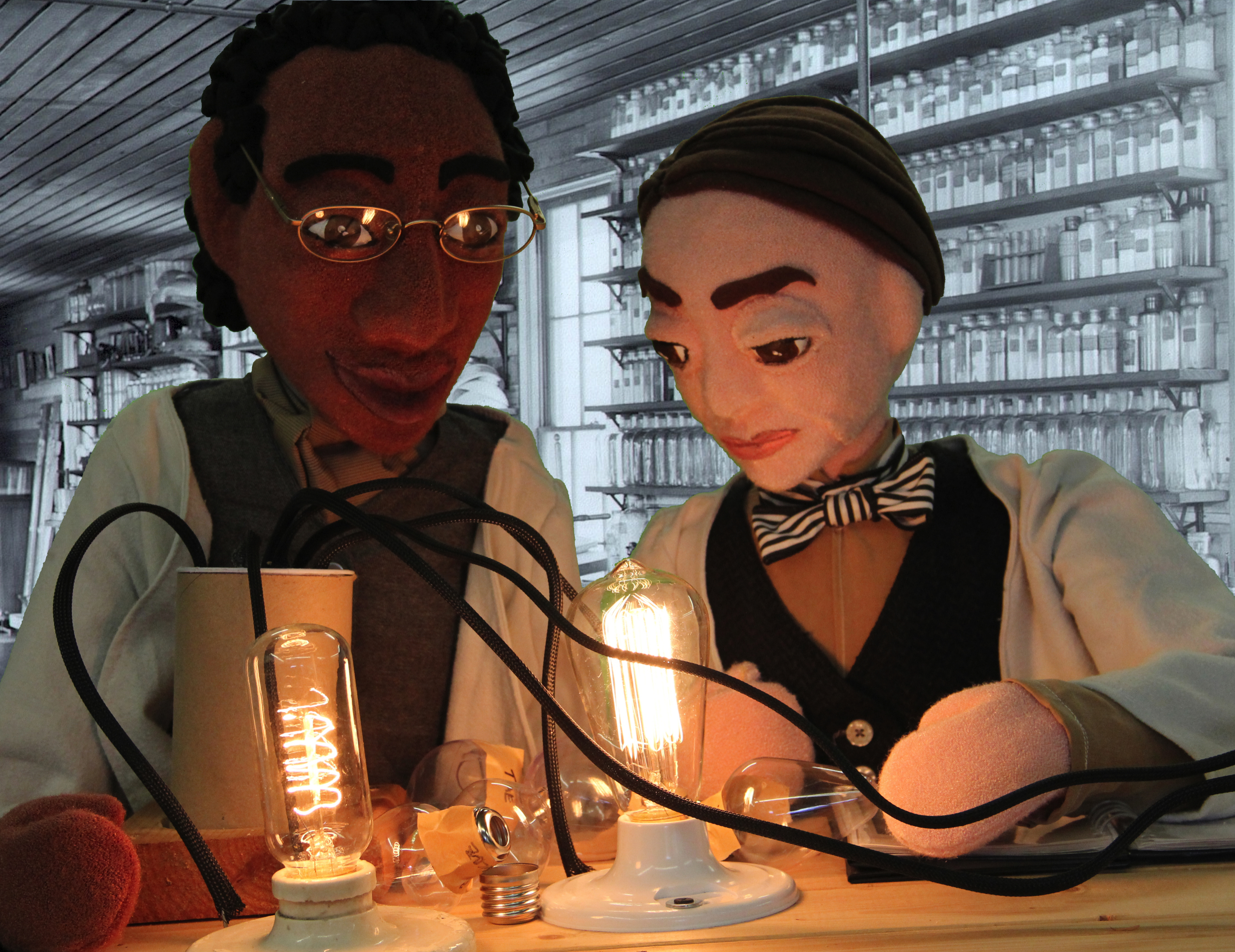
Edison and Latimer from the puppet show Electricity!

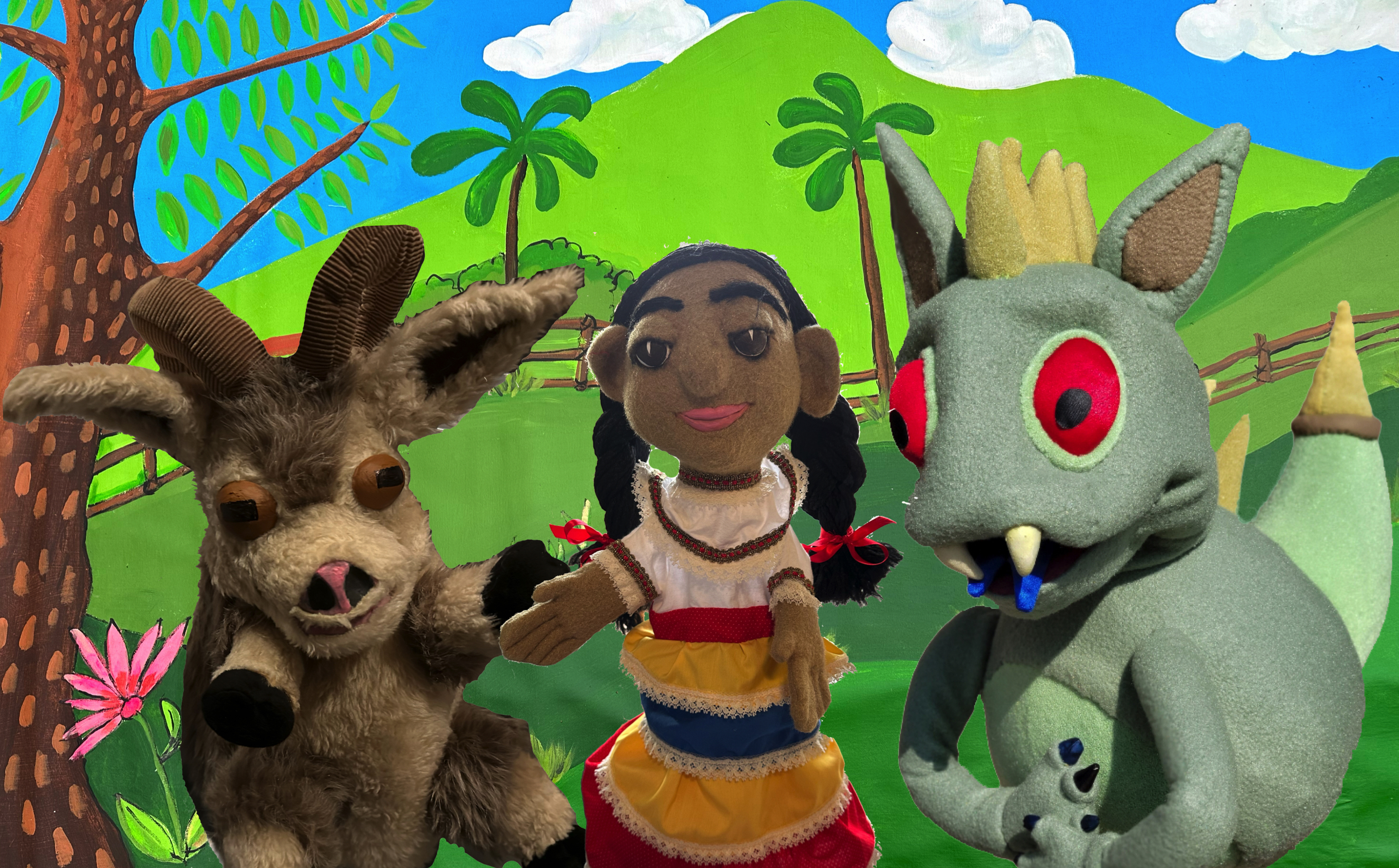
Pedro, Ana, and Tito from the puppet show 'The Friendly Chupacabra'

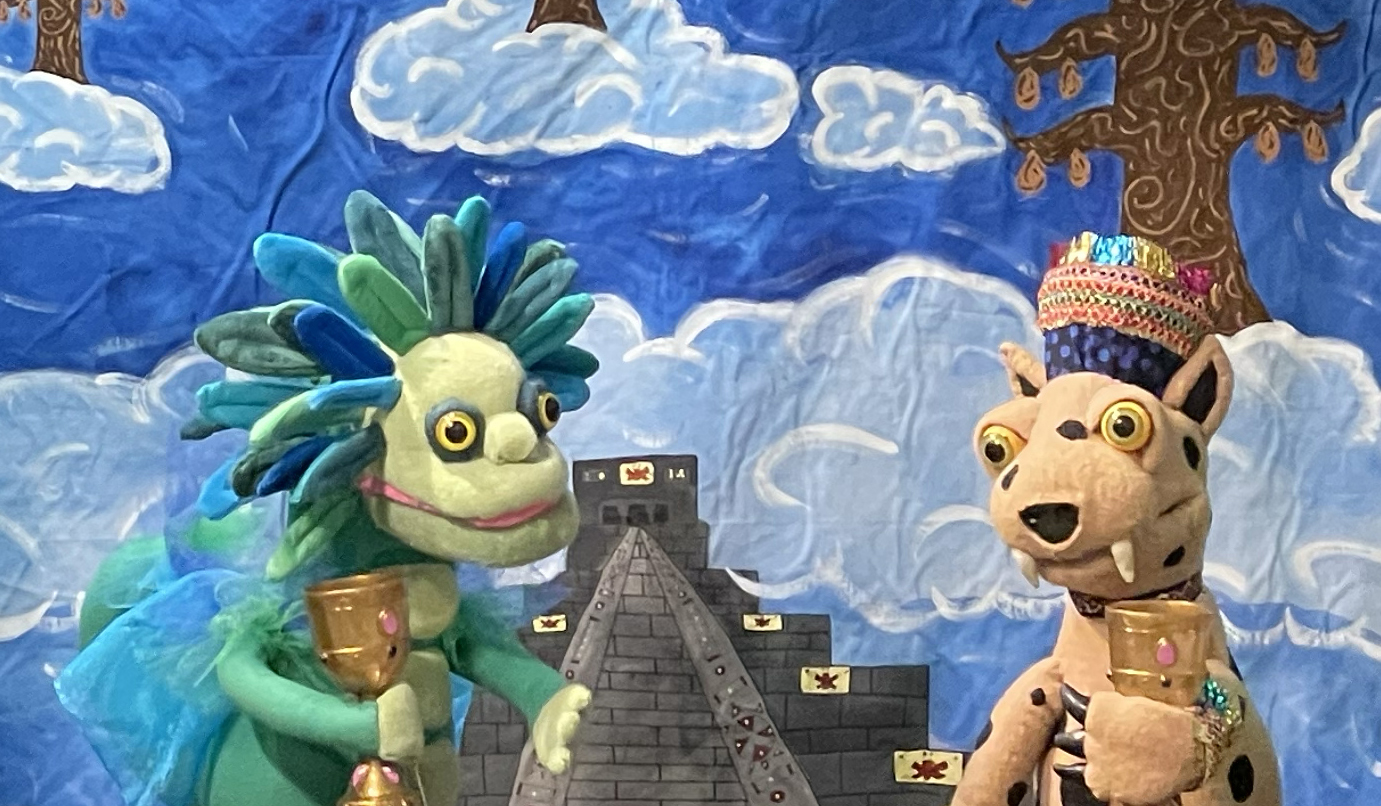
Two gods from the Blue Frog puppet show debate whether they should share chocolate with humans

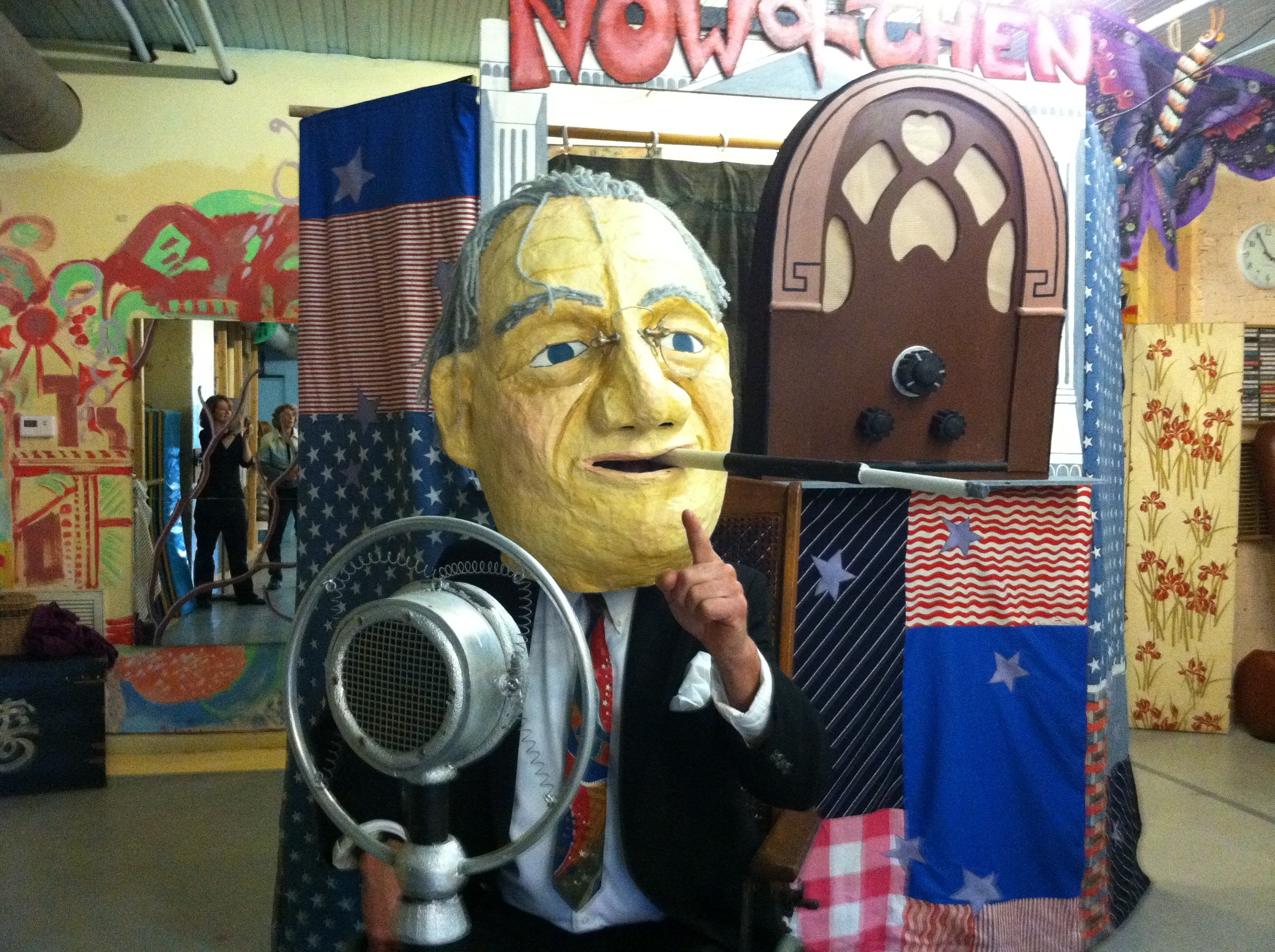
FDR puppet gives fireside chat in Greed!

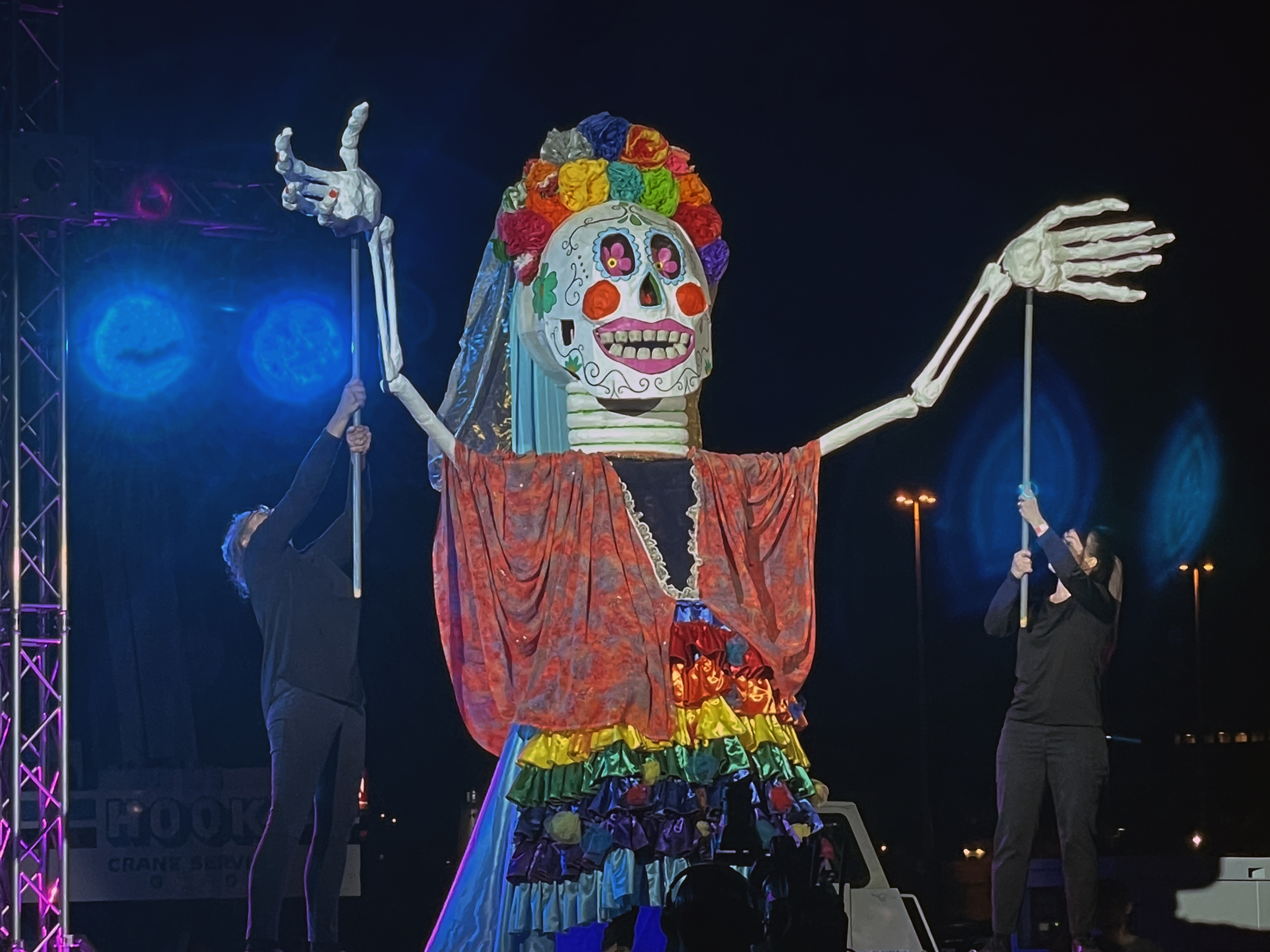
Giant La Calavera Catrina puppet used in parades and various productions in Tucson, Arizona

=== Productions ===
Year	Production	Description	Note
1978	Life After Death	Shadow puppets on overhead projectors. About abortion as a confrontation to the Great Mother archetype. It is based on dozens of interviews with women.	Received a National Endowment for the Arts grant.
1979	Here's Looking at Eu-clid	Ballet of geometric forms.	With Rose and Thorn Puppet Theater for United Puppet Artists in Minneapolis production.
1979	The Hungry Child	Tabletop marionettes were used to tell an old Irish folk tale.	With Rose and Thorn Puppet Theater for United Puppet Artists in Minneapolis production.
1980	Baba Yaga	Show about a walking house, an enchanted hedgehog, a lost little girl, and Baba Yaga the witch.	Built and performed show with Ray St. Louis as part of Rose and Thorn Puppets.
1984	Life of the Buddha	Overhead projector shadow puppets were used to accompany a special LACMA museum exhibit on Buddhist Art.	
1986	Eros and Psyche	Bunraku style rod puppets, giant puppets, and black theatre sequence to tell ancient story of overcoming obstacles to love. Performed at UCLA and the National Puppet Festival.	Received a Puppeteers of America Endowment grant.
1992-Ongoing	Adventures in Folklore	Hand puppets are used to tell four folktales: Jack and the Beanstalk with a Celtic rendition; Dogs and Masters is a light romp through Parisian parks; Kamala's Drum is a Himalayan folk tale about the spirit of generosity; and The Three Little Pigs is a fast-paced, rap version of the popular story.	First track: Music and narration by world-renowned harpist Robin Williamson. Third track: original music by Lynn Anderson. The show's MC is Rowby, who charms the audience.
1994	Facing Both Ways	Bunraku style rod puppets, hand puppets, overhead projected shadows were used to explore the Celtic idea of lifting the veil between worlds. The show featured fairies, ancient Kings, female goddesses, and shape-shifters.	Received a Puppeteers of America Endowment grant and a Jim Henson Foundation grant.
1996	Still Life	This shows used hand puppets and black light puppets. It was developed at the O'Neil. It is about realizing potential and is based on a dream of finding a live baby in the attic.	Original music by Larry Siegel. Received a Puppeteers of America Endowment grant and a Jim Henson Foundation grant.
1997-Ongoing	The Legend of La Befana	The show uses over 50 puppets: rod puppets, marionettes, hand puppets, black light puppets, and an angel costume. The Legend is a favorite Christmas story in Italy. It is about an old woman who is visited by the magi and leaves her home and cat in search of the Christ-child.	Original music by Cathy Riley.
1999	Guignol	Hand puppets were used to tell a traditional French story.	
2002	The Mystery of the Salt Crystal	Rod puppets and character costumes were used to tell this Medieval legend about the historical importance of salt.	Performed with Peter Baird. Original music by Cathy Riley.
2003-Ongoing	Aesop's Fables	Tabletop rod puppets, a marionette, and a hand and mouth puppet are used to tell these classic tales: The Lion and the Mouse, The Tortoise and the Hare, The Owl and the Grasshopper, The Fox and the Crow, The Crow and the Pitcher, and The Stork and the Fox.	Original music by Cathy Riley. Toured nationally.
2007-Ongoing	The Big Dipper	Marionettes and overhead projected shadows are used to tell four cultural legends. The show includes scientific facts to enhance the educational value of the show.	Music by Lief Stevenson. Includes elaborate painted and sewn backdrops. Received a Puppeteers of America Endowment grant.
2011-Ongoing	Hansel and Gretel	Marionettes and shadow puppets tell this popular fairytale of empowerment, determination, and triumph.	
2012	Beware of Deleware	Toy theatre, marionettes, and animated props are used to create a playful expose on the huge number of corporations registered in the tiny state of Delaware.	A political puppet slam piece for adult audiences. Based on Deep Economics by Mark Blessington. Available on YouTube.
2012	BeeSting	A lyrical outpouring of creative force, addressing the emotional, physical, and spiritual challenges of breast cancer against a backdrop of our declining bee population.	Directed by Diane Tower-Jones and music by Layne Redmond.
2012	GREED!	A set of multiple puppet shows using hand puppets, shadow puppets, marionettes, costume characters, giant masks, oversized props, and 2D cutouts. The vignettes elucidate the complexities fueling economic inequality and unrest.	Based on Deep Economics by Mark Blessington. A political puppet slam piece for adult audiences.
2013-Ongoing	Little One-Inch	Tabletop marionettes with authentic Japanese costumes tell this ancient legend of an old couple whose prayers are answered when they find a small baby by the side of the road.	Received a Puppeteers of America Endowment grant.
2014-Ongoing	Electricity!	Large Bunraku and rod table-top puppets and 2D paper puppet animations explain how historical figures and famous scientists used careful observation and built on each other's knowledge to invent the compass, the lightning rod, the battery, the motor, and the electric light bulb.	Toured nationally.
2019-Ongoing	The Chicken and the Egg: Life Cycles	Shadow and rod puppets reveal the life cycles of various plant and animal groups.	Original music by Katherine O'Shea. Toured nationally.
2021-Ongoing	The Ugly Duckling	An "ugly duckling" finds the place where he belongs. Sturz's version of this classical story is told in rhyme.	Original music throughout by Brandon Leatherland.
2021	Three Sisters	All Souls Procession finale prformance. Performance and singing by Lisa Sturz, Elysia Hansel, and Katie Popiel.	Music by Michael Egan, lyrics by Tom Jacobson, recording and instrumentation by Kevin Larkin.
2021-Ongoing	La Calavera Katrina	This 10-foot tall puppet is based on the popular female skeleton figure and iconic symbol of Día de los Muertos (Day of the Dead) in Mexico, known for her stylish clothing and feathered hat.	Used in various Tucson Day of the Dead concerts and processions.
2022-Ongoing	The Barking Mouse and The Blue Frog	A mother mouse wittily demonstrates the value of learning a second language by barking to scare away a threatening cat. The Blue Frog is the Mayan version of the legend of how the people of the Earth were gifted with chocolate. See promo video.	Both shows are bilingual.
2023-Ongoing	The Friendly Chupacabra	The chupacabra is a source of fear and wonder in Latino countries and parts of the Southern United States. This bilingual story takes place in Puerto Rico where a brave girl and her goat tame the chupacabra beast with friendship. See promo video.	A bilingual show.
2024	Soft Rains	Sturz collaborated with Noa Moquin and Luis Castillo Silva to create a shadow puppet show as part of a literary event sponsored by Biosphere 2 honoring Ray Bradbury's The Martian Chronicles.	Original music by Noa Moquin
1980s-Ongoing	Adult Puppet Slam Network	Over several decades, Sturz has curated and produced Adult Puppetry Slams in Minneapolis, Los Angeles, Asheville, and Tucson. Each slam is a collection of short vignettes with a variety of puppet styles created by multiple performers.	Encourages non-professional participation.

=== Puppet design and fabrication ===
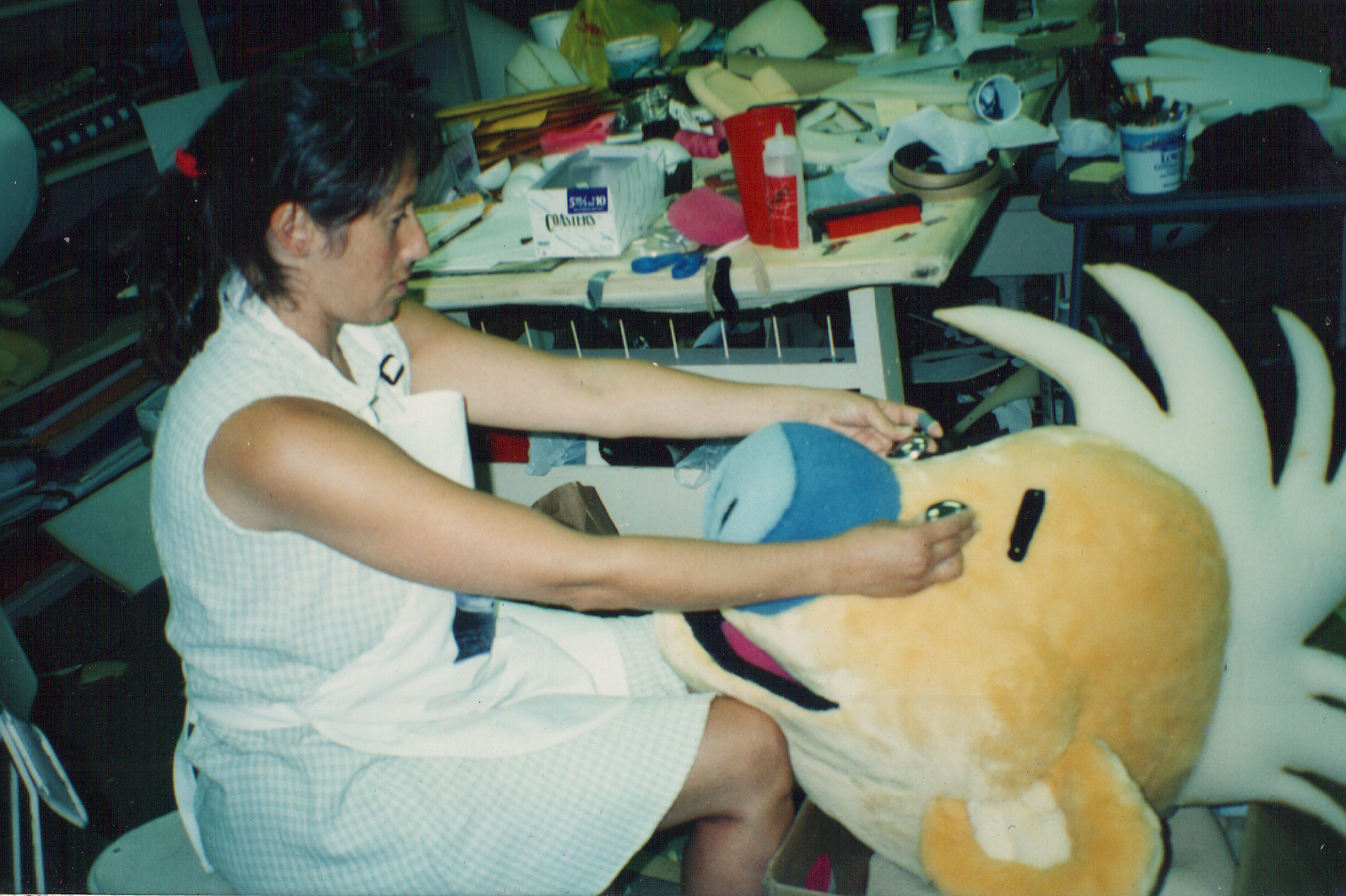
Sturz making an Ice Capades mascot

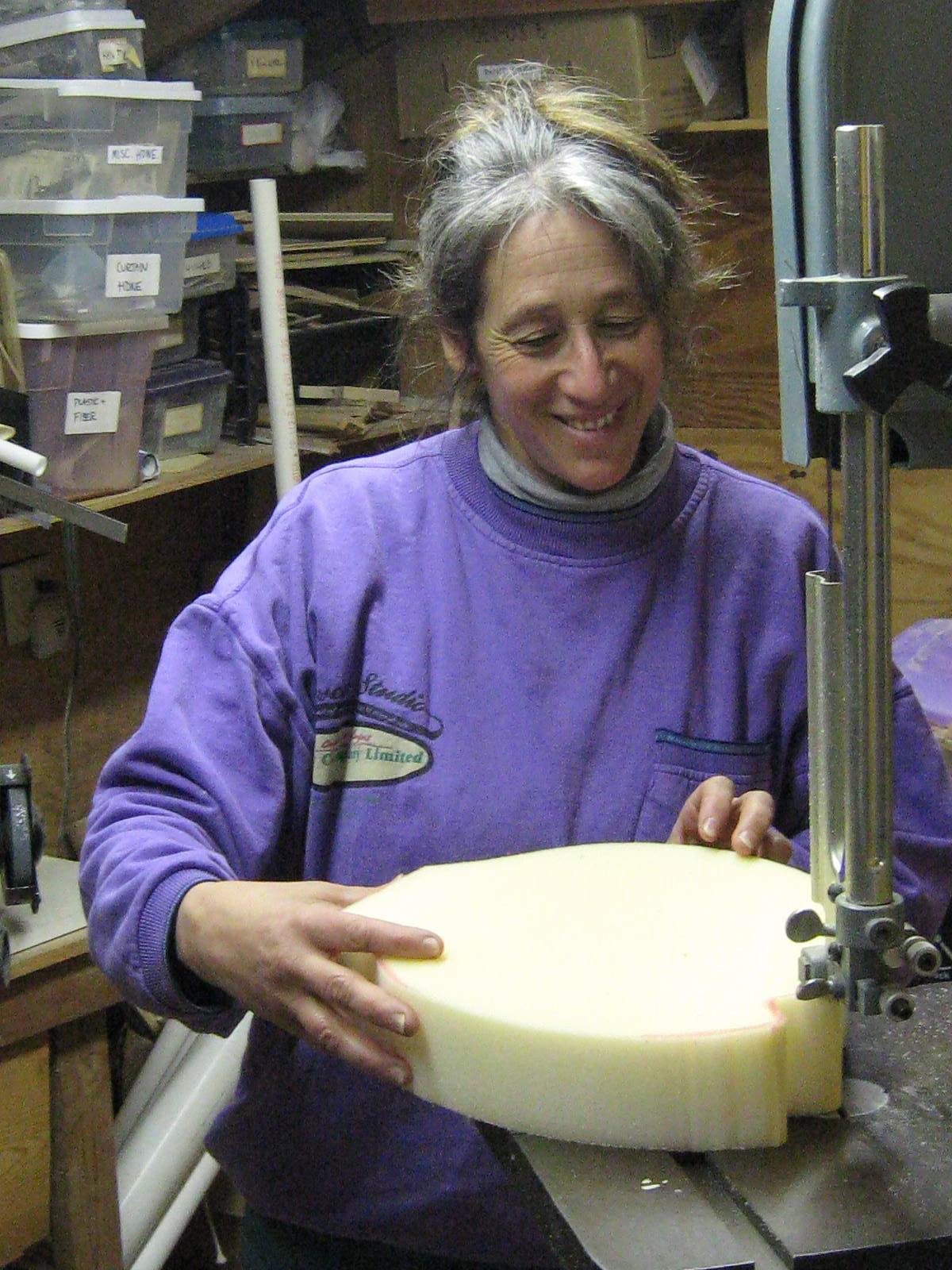
Sturz in Asheville NC studio

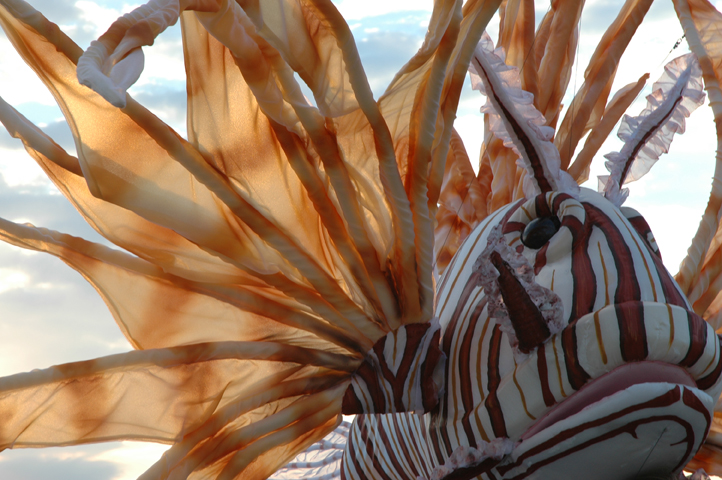
Lionfish designed and built for the North Carolina Aquarium

Sturz started making molds at The Hand Prop Room in 1985 and then worked at Walt Disney Imagineering and Jim Henson's Creature Shop. Some of her large-scale puppet builds were for Chicago's Field Museum of Natural History and the Shedd Aquarium.

Year	Client or employer	Role
1985	The Hand Prop Room	Mold maker
1986-1987	Walt Disney Imagineering	Prop construction, character fabrication, puppetry consultant
1987	Sid and Marty Krofft	Puppet builder and performer
1988	The Character Shop	Puppet fabrication
1990-2002	All Effects	Puppet builder and performer
1991	Jim Henson's Creature Shop	Dinosaur and creature costume fabricator, dresser
1992	Pasadena Puppet Shop	Puppet fabrication
1993	Industrial Light and Magic Creature Shop	Puppet fabrication
1993-1994	Universal Production Services: Costume Shop	Department Head: Character Costume Division
1994-1996	Ice Capades	Character Costume Department Head, Lead Patternmaker
1996	Biltmore Estate	Design, build, and perform characters for Saint George and the Dragon
1999-2005	Shedd Aquarium	Design and build giant exhibition figures: crab, shark, octopus, and stingray to promote their Wild Reef exhibit
2001	UNC Asheville Drama Department	Fabricate costumes for the Velveteen Rabbit
2002	Tennessee Aquarium	Design, build, and install giant jellyfish
2004	Flat Rock Playhouse	Build enchanted costumes for their Beauty and the Beast production
2005	Harrah's Cherokee Casino	Design and build giant parade figures: Uk'tena, water beetle, buzzard
2005	Field Museum of Natural History	Design and build giant exhibition figures: Tyrannosaurus Rex, Triceratops
2005-2006	North Carolina Aquarium at Fort Fisher	Design and build giant exhibition figures: lionfish, oyster reef
2007	UNC-TV	Design, build, and perform puppets for Let's Go Shopping with Read-a-Roo
2008	City of Asheville	Design, build, and install giant parade float figures: snowmen, nutcracker, reindeer, teacups
2008	Blue Ridge Motion Pictures	Design and build figures for Uncle Rhubarb
2012	Bubbleland LLC	Build Denton the Dragon puppet. Work with illustrator Jerry Pope to build a large Denton puppet and other characters for short films.
2014	Parelli Natural Horsemanship	Build horse heads
2016	Silver Dollar City (theme park)	Design and build giant puppets and decorations for Christmas show
2020	Children's Museum Tucson	Design and build giant scorpion, milk bottle, snake, outdoor fort, and cactus bean-bag game
2021	North Carolina Arboretum	Design and build bird mobile for permanent educational installation

== Commercials ==
Sturz was hired to create or perform puppets for a variety of commercials. She was a principal puppeteer for the 1987 Chevrolet Corsica ad with aliens in a spacecraft called The Collector. It was shot in Douglas Trumbull's Showscan process which featured a unique visual style: 70mm film photographed and projected at 60 frames per second, 2.5 times the standard movie speed. The ad celebrated Chevrolet's 75th Anniversary.

The 1996 ad for Diet Snapple by creative director Richard Kirshenbaum, The Ultimate Frontier, won a Paley award for Best Spots of April, 1996. Sturz designed, fabricated, and operated the sock puppets for this commercial.

== Publications ==
Sturz wrote a book chapter: Puppetry and Virtual Theater (Chapter 7, with contributions from Tim Lawrence, Wendy Morton, Brad Shur, and Kirk Thatcher) in the book The Egyptian Oracle Project: Ancient Ceremony Augmented Reality by Robyn Gillam and Jeffrey Jacobson in 2015.

Sturz has contributed 13 articles to The Puppetry Journal

1. Puppetry at UCLA: East-West Fusion with Carol Sorgenfrei, 1983
2. On Camera with Mark Bryan Wilson, 1990
3. Creating New Work for Adult Audiences with Michael Davis, 1995
4. Constructive Criticism: Tell Me What You Think, 2003
5. Three Giant Sea Creatures-You Want Them WHEN??, 2003
6. Southeast (North Carolina) Festival Report, 2004
7. Think Big, 2005
8. Kinetic Steel: The Marionettes of John Payne (cover story), 2008
9. Back to School – Reclaiming a Role in the Schools Through Curriculum-Based Performance, 2009
10. BeeSting, 2011
11. Puppet Evolution: Film and Technology with Jeffrey Jacobson and Tim Lawrence, 2013
12. Full Steam Ahead, 2014
13. My Grandfather's Prayers, 2018

Sturz has contributed three articles to Puppetry International

1. Lisa Sturz Thinks Big, 2007
2. Savoring the Salt Crystal, 2016
3. Puppetry in the Ring, 2021

Sturz published a second article with Mark Bryan Wilson in 1991: On Camera: SAG Puppeteers, The Modern Practice of an Ancient Art. She also published an article about My Grandfather's Prayers in WNC Woman.
