= Driving the Future =

2015 book by Margo T. Oge

Driving the Future: Combating Climate Change with Cleaner, Smarter Cars
- First edition
- Author: Margo T. Oge
- Genre: Nonfiction
- Published: 2015
- Publisher: Arcade Press
- ISBN: 978-1-62872-538-4

Driving the Future: Combating Climate Change with Cleaner, Smarter Cars is the first book of Margo T. Oge, who served as the director of the Environmental Protection Agency's Office of Transportation and Air Quality from 1994 to 2012. The book covers climate science, politics, regulations, auto technology and proposes how to meet greenhouse gas reduction goals. The book combines primary source research, Oge's first-hand knowledge of events and dozens of interviews with technical, environmental, regulatory, policy and legal experts. It is organized into three sections.

== Section 1 ==
In the first, Oge reviews the origins of climate change theory dating back to the 1800s and the politicization of climate change-related issues beginning in the 1980s.

== Section 2 ==
The second section details an ultimately successful effort to regulate greenhouse gas emissions from passenger vehicles. This effort resulted in changes to both Corporate Average Fuel Economy and, under the authority of the EPA, established the first ever federal greenhouse gas standards. As a result of these rules, manufacturers' fleets must average 54.5 mpg by 2025. The Economist magazine ranked them as the sixth most effective international action to reduce greenhouse gas emissions.

== Section 3 ==
The third section examines the necessity and possibility of much more dramatic increases in fuel economy while accelerating the reduction of greenhouse gas emissions. Oge argues that, to meet the goal of a less than 2 degree Celsius rise in global temperatures, cars and trucks will have to average the equivalent of 180 mpg. Oge writes that this is possible using a combination of auto technologies, including more efficient internal combustion engines, battery electric, fuel cell and hybrid vehicles, higher energy density batteries, non-food stock bio-fuels, autonomous vehicles and connected vehicles.

== Global trends ==
Oge also predicts that several global trends, including the growth of mega-cities, internationally converging fuel economy regulations and demand-side peak oil will ultimately result in reduced greenhouse gas emissions from passenger vehicles. Oge also examines the impact of social trends, such as a reduced rate of vehicle ownership and driver's licenses as well as increasing use of ride-sharing and on-demand cars among Millennials in OECD nations. She believes that electric cars are essential to hitting greenhouse gas targets and predicts that in the decades to come we will see widespread conversion to pure electric vehicles.

== Critical response ==
Kirkus Reviews highlights that the book is "highly detailed and carries the authority of a woman who has fought diligently and consistently for each step forward on the efficiency regulations she sees as a crucial part of our nation's response to climate change".
