= Margo T. Oge =

American engineer and director of the Environmental Protection Agency

- Education: University of Massachusetts Lowell
- Occupations: Engineer, environmental regulator, author
- Spouse: Cuneyt Oge
- Children: 2
- Website: margooge.com

Margo T. Oge is an engineer, environmental regulator, and author who made significant contributions to air quality and transportation emissions standards in the United States. She dedicated 32 years to the Environmental Protection Agency (EPA), retiring in 2012.

== Early life and education ==
Born in Athens, Greece, Oge studied in the United States and received a master's degree in engineering from the University of Massachusetts Lowell.

== EPA career ==
Oge began working at the EPA in 1980 in the Office of Toxic Chemicals. In 1986, she was assigned to the office of Rhode Island Senator John Chafee, where she helped draft legislation requiring plastic six-pack rings to be biodegradable. In 1990, she became the director of the EPA's Office of Indoor Air and Radiation. In 1993, her office released a report finding that secondhand smoke posed a public health risk. The report was delayed due to legal challenges by the tobacco industry but was upheld by the courts in 2002.

In 1994, Oge became director of the Office of Transportation and Air Quality. Her office issued multiple regulations reducing emissions from heavy-duty trucks, buses, locomotives, marine vessels, and off-road equipment. The EPA estimates these programs prevent over 40,000 premature deaths annually. Her office also implemented the Renewable Fuel Standard.

== 2010 and 2012 greenhouse gas regulations ==
In 2009, Oge’s office, alongside the National Highway Traffic Safety Administration and California officials, began developing new vehicle emissions and fuel economy standards. These efforts culminated in the 2010 national program, the first federal regulation targeting greenhouse gas emissions from vehicles.

In 2011, she led EPA’s development of the first greenhouse gas and fuel efficiency rules for medium- and heavy-duty trucks for model years 2014–2018.

In 2012, the program was extended through 2025, requiring automakers to reach a fleet-wide average of 54.5 mpg and halve greenhouse gas emissions from 2010 levels. The Economist ranked the rules among the world's most effective climate measures in 2014.

== Post-EPA life ==
Oge retired in 2012 and now serves as Chair Emeritus of the International Council on Clean Transportation (ICCT). She is a board member of the Union of Concerned Scientists and a Distinguished Fellow at the ClimateWorks Foundation. Oge also advises the Climate Imperative Foundation and Deloitte Center for Sustainability Progress.

She previously served on the Volkswagen Sustainability Council and the National Academies of Sciences, Engineering, and Medicine’s Board on Energy and Environmental Systems.

In 2015, Arcade Publishing released her book, Driving the Future: Combating Climate Change with Cleaner, Smarter Cars.
