= Margo Kaplan =

American legal scholar

== Education ==
Kaplan received her bachelor's degree from Cornell University in 1999, her Master in Public Administration from Harvard University's John F. Kennedy School of Government in 2004, and her Juris Doctor from New York University School of Law in 2004.

== Research ==
Kaplan's research pertains to state involvement in individual health decisions, as well as criminal law as it pertains to sex and health.

== Views ==
=== Pedophilia ===
Kaplan wrote an opinion piece in the October 6, 2014 edition of the New York Times arguing that the provisions of the Americans With Disabilities Act of 1990 and Section 504 of the Rehabilitation Act of 1973 that exclude pedophiles from protection should be reconsidered. She also criticized pedophilia laws for emphasizing "punishment, not prevention," because these laws, according to her, "ignore pedophilia until after the commission of a sexual offense." She expected to receive about 95% negative emails in response to the column, but told Philadelphia that same day that she had instead "gotten so many positive ones." The article received more than 1,200 online comments within a week, some of which were rejected by the Times' moderators for attacking Kaplan and/or other commenters who expressed sympathy for pedophiles. Kaplan said she was not surprised by the negative comments her column received, saying, "People commonly confuse pedophilia with child sexual abuse. So if you even mention something that sounds empathetic to the mental disorder of pedophilia, people might incorrectly think you are excusing child sexual abuse." Two days later, Keith Ablow responded to Kaplan's column, arguing that although he agreed with it on many points, he thought that Kaplan "is wrong to suggest that, merely because something is a known disorder, it should result in protections under the law" and arguing that "If a pedophile wants to not attack children, he can receive confidential psychiatric treatment – including Depo-Provera to lower testosterone levels – to make it much less likely."

=== Abortion clinics ===
Kaplan has criticized conservative politicians who attempted to defund Planned Parenthood for allowing women to donate their embryos to medical research, but not targeting fertility clinics that, according to her, allow women to do exactly the same thing. Kaplan argued that this hypocrisy reveals "an ugly truth about abortion restrictions: that they are often less about protecting life than about controlling women's bodies." Drawing on her own experience with IVF, she reasoned that "IVF patients make less-attractive targets because we don't challenge the expectation that women want to be mothers. Abortion, on the other hand, thwarts conservative ideals about a woman's proper role as a wife and mother. This may be why, counterintuitively, I have greater freedom to decide what to do with an embryo in a petri dish than a pregnancy in my own body."
