= Margo Veillon =

Swiss-Egyptian artist

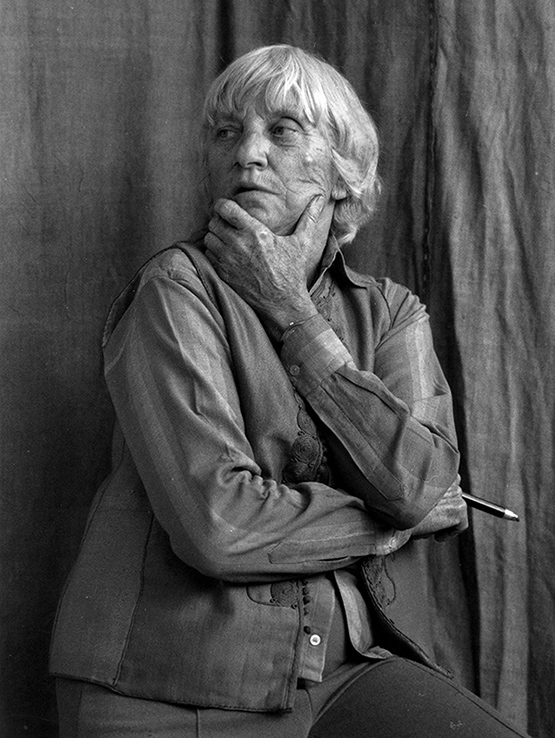
- Born: Margo Veillon; 19 February 1907; Cairo, Egypt
- Died: 9 June 2003 (aged 96); Cairo, Egypt
- Education: Zurich, Paris

Margo Veillon (born 19 February 1907 in Cairo, Egypt - died 9 June 2003 in Cairo, Egypt) was a Swiss artist who lived and worked in Cairo. She is known mainly for her oil paintings, but also produced watercolors, drawings, prints, and other art forms.

== Biography ==
Margo Veillon was born in Cairo in 1907, to a Swiss father and an Austrian mother. Her family was well off, and lived in a villa in the suburb of Maadi. Margo began to draw from an early age, and some of her drawings from her teenage years survive in the collection at the American University in Cairo. After attending school in Egypt and Switzerland, she moved to Paris in 1929 to study fine art. During her stay there, she was exposed to the art movements of the time, including surrealism, with which she experimented in her paintings. She remained in Paris until 1932, and then returned to Egypt, where she lived for the rest of her life, though she travelled widely, and spent extended periods of time in England and the US. She held several solo exhibitions in Egypt and abroad, and received recognition for her depictions or Egyptian landscapes and people. Shortly before her death, she concluded an agreement with the American University in Cairo to preserve her work. Her entire atelier was transferred to the AUC, where it remains as part of the university's art collection.

== Exhibitions ==
Veillon showed her work at several group exhibitions and solo exhibits in Egypt and abroad. They include the following:

- 1928, Société des amis de l'art (Cairo)
- 1930, Galerie Forster (Zurich)
- 1931, Kunsthaus Zürich (Zurich)
- 1932, Société des amis de l'art (Cairo)
- 1932, l'Atelier d'Alexandrie (Alexandria)
- 1933, Société des amis de l'art (Cairo)
- 1933, Galerie Forster (Zurich)
- 1934, Lyceum Club (Zurich)
- 1934, Turnus-Ausstellung des Schweizer Kunstvereins (Aarau)
- 1935, Société des amis de l'art (Cairo)
- 1936, Schweizer nationale Kunstausstellung (Berne?)
- 1937, Société des amis de l'art (Cairo)
- 1943, Cercle suisse (Alexandria)
- 1946, Helmhaus (Zurich)
- 1947, St. Annahof (Zurich)
- 1948, l'Atelier d'Alexandrie (Alexandria)
- 1948, Kunsthalle Bern (Berne)
- 1949, l'Atelier d'Alexandrie (Alexandria)
- 1951, Lycée français (Cairo)
- 1953, l'Atelier d'Alexandrie (Alexandria)
- 1953, Museum of Modern Art (Cairo)
- 1954, Cercle suisse (Alexandria)
- 1955, Museum of Fine Arts (Alexandria)
- 1960, The American University in Cairo (Cairo)
- 1964, Galerie Läubli (Zurich)
- 1980, Trafford Gallery (London)
- 1982, The American University in Cairo (Cairo)
- 1986, Mashrabiyah Gallery (Cairo)
- 1990, Galerie Sonegal (Zurich)
- 1993, Hyposwiss Bank (Zurich)
- 1994, Banco di Lugano (Lugano)
- 1995, Cairo-Berlin Gallery, Cairo
- 1996, Espace Bally (Zurich)
- 1997, Cairo-Berlin Gallery, Cairo
- 1998, Cairo-Berlin Gallery, Cairo
- 1999, Cairo-Berlin Gallery, Cairo
- 2000, Cairo-Berlin Gallery, Cairo
- 2002, The American University in Cairo (Cairo)

== Bibliography ==
- Ronfard, Bruno. Margo Veillon : Drawing Egypt from the Artistic Legacy Collection at the American University in Cairo. American University in Cairo Press 2013.
- Ronfard, Bruno, ed. Margo Veillon: Witness of a Century. American University in Cairo Press, 2007.
- John Rodenbeck. Nubia : Sketches Notes and Photographs. American University in Cairo Press, 2004.
- Ronfard, Bruno. Margo Veillon : Painting Egypt : The Masterpiece Collection at the American University in Cairo. American University in Cairo Press 2003.
- Ronfard, Bruno & Rodenbeck, John. Egyptian Festivals. American University in Cairo Press 2002.
- Veillon Margo. The Drawings of Margo Veillon : A Diary. American University in Cairo 1996.
- Hug Charlotte. Margo Veillon : Le Mouvement Éclaté : Travaux 1925 À 1996. Acatos 1996.
- Veillon Margo et al. Margo Veillon : Une vie une oeuvre une passion. Aleph 1987.
