= Margo McCaffery =

American nurse (died 2018)

Margo McCaffery was an American registered nurse and pioneer of the field of pain management nursing. McCaffery's oft-quoted definition of pain as "whatever the experiencing person says it is, existing whenever and wherever the person says it does", stated as early as 1968, has become the prevailing conceptualization of pain for clinicians over the past few decades.

McCaffery died on January 8, 2018.
