= Margo Anderson =

Margo Anderson may refer to:

- Margo J. Anderson (born 1945), American social historian and historian of statistics
- Margo Anderson (writer), American journalist and book author
