= Margo Rose =

American puppeteer

Margo Rose (January 31, 1903 – September 13, 1997) was an American puppeteer. She designed many puppets for films and the show Howdy Doody with her husband. The couple won a Peabody Award for ''The Blue Ferry" in 1958.

== Biography ==
Rose was born Margaret Skewis on January 31, 1903, in Inwood, Iowa, to Charles Skewis and Myrtle Skewis. She attended Cornell College, and upon receiving a fine arts degree she joined the Tony Sarg Marionette Company in 1927. She stayed there for two years, before traveling to Italy to spend a year at the British Academy, studying sculpture. The next year, 1930, she married another puppeteer, Rufus Rose. The couple soon struck out on their own, founding Rufus Rose Marionettes and touring the country. They worked with Starg on several occasions, including at the Century of Progress exhibition. The first full-length puppet movie, Jerry Pulls the Strings (1937) was released by Rose.

At the start of World War II, the couple stopped puppeteering, and Rose took a job working as a nurse with the American Red Cross. In 1948, they put on a TV adaption of A Christmas Carol, Scrooge!, which was the first full-length marionette production performed live on national television. In 1952 the couple began working on The Howdy Doody Show, designing several new characters. Around the same time, Rose and Rufus Rose created The Blue Fairy, a show for which they won a Peabody Award in 1958. In the 1960s, a large fire destroyed hundreds of their puppets. The couple continued working, creating puppets for television films including Treasure Island, Rip van Winkle and Aladdin. The couple created and produced over fifteen marionette productions as well as many other films, commercials, and projects. Rufus and Rose were prominent in founding Eugene O'Neill Memorial Theater Center, and the National Theater of the Deaf.

She remained active teaching puppetry until weeks before her death. In 1997 she was inducted into the Connecticut Women's Hall of Fame.
