= 1951–52 United States network television schedule (daytime) =

The following are the programs for the 1951–1952 United States network television weekday schedule, listing daytime Monday–Friday schedules on four networks for each calendar season from September 1951 to August 1952. All times are Eastern and Pacific. This page is missing info on the DuMont Television Network, which started daytime transmission before any other United States television network.

Talk shows are highlighted in yellow, local programming is white, reruns of prime-time programming are orange, game shows are pink, soap operas are chartreuse, news programs are gold and all others are light blue. New series are highlighted in bold.

== Fall 1951 ==
	10:30 am	11:00 am	11:30 am	noon	12:30 pm	1:00 pm	1:30 pm	2:00 pm	2:30 pm	3:00 pm	3:30 pm	4:00 pm	4:30 pm	5:00 pm	5:30 pm
ABC	local programming		**The Dennis James Show**	**The Frances Langford-Don Ameche Show**		1:00 pm: **Gayelord Hauser Show** (from 10/31) (W F) 1:15 pm: local programming	local programming
CBS	Two Sleepy People (until 10/26)	local programming	Strike It Rich	12:00 Noon: **The Egg and I** 12:15 pm: **Love of Life**	12:30 pm: **Search for Tomorrow** 12:45 pm: The Steve Allen Show (talk show)		The Garry Moore Show		2:30 pm: The First Hundred Years 2:45 pm: Vanity Fair (to 3,15 pm MWF, until 11/2) / Bride and Groom (Tu Th) 3:00 pm: Vanity Fair (Tu Th, until 11/2) / **Mike and Buff** (variety) 3:15 pm: Bride and Groom (Tu Th) (until 11/1)		Meet Your Cover Girl (Th; until 11/1) / All Around the Town (MWF) / **The Mel Torme Show** (from 11/5)	Homemaker's Exchange	**The Mel Torme Show** (until 10/26)	local programming	5:30 pm: **The Whistling Wizard** 5:45 pm: local programming
NBC	local programming			**Ruth Lyons 50 Club**	local programming					3:00 Miss Susan 3:15 Vacation Wonderland (to 10/14) / **Here's Looking at You**	Bert Parks Show (MWF) / **The Bill Goodwin Show** (Tu Th)	The Kate Smith Hour		5:00 pm: Hawkins Falls 5:15 pm: **The Gabby Hayes Show**	Howdy Doody
DMN	?

== Winter 1951/1952 ==
	7:00 am	7:30 am	8:00 am	8:30 am	9:00 am	9:30 am	10:00 am	10:30 am	11:00 am	11:30 am	noon	12:30 pm	1:00 pm	1:30 pm	2:00 pm	2:30 pm	3:00 pm	3:30 pm	4:00 pm	4:30 pm	5:00 pm	5:30 pm
ABC	local programming									The Dennis James Show / **The Paul Dixon Show** (MWF, from 2/23)	The Frances Langford-Don Ameche Show		1:00 pm: Gayelord Hauser Show (W F) 1:15 pm: local programming	local programming
CBS	local programming					9:30 am: local programming 9:45 am: **Morning News** (to 10:30 am F)	10:00 am **Arthur Godfrey Time** 10:45 am: **The Al Pearce Show**			Strike It Rich	12:00 Noon: The Egg and I 12:15 pm: Love of Life	12:30 pm: Search for Tomorrow 12:45 pm: The Steve Allen Show (talk show -to 2/22)		The Garry Moore Show		2:30 pm: The First Hundred Years 2:45 pm: Bride and Groom (until 2/1) 3:00 pm: Mike and Buff (variety, from 2/4 from 2:45 pm)		**Bert Parks Show** / The Mel Torme Show (Tu Th)	Homemaker's Exchange (to 1/25)	local programming
NBC	**The Today Show**				local programming		**Breakfast Party**	It's in the Bag (to 2/15) / **Winner Take All** (from 2/27)	**Kovacs on the Corner**	11:30 am: **Dave & Charlie** 11:45 am: **Richard Harkness News Review**	Ruth Lyons 50 Club	**The Bunch** / **It's a Problem** (from 2/25)	local programming				**The Big Payoff**	**The Ralph Edwards Show** (MWF) / The Bill Goodwin Show (Tu Th)	The Kate Smith Hour		5:00 pm: Hawkins Falls 5:15 pm: The Gabby Hayes Show	Howdy Doody
DMN	?

== Spring 1952 ==
	7:00 am	7:30 am	8:00 am	8:30 am	9:00 am	9:30 am	10:00 am	10:30 am	11:00 am	11:30 am	noon	12:30 pm	1:00 pm	1:30 pm	2:00 pm	2:30 pm	3:00 pm	3:30 pm	4:00 pm	4:30 pm	5:00 pm	5:30 pm
ABC	local programming											The Paul Dixon Show (to 5/3)	1:00 pm: Gayelord Hauser Show (W F, to 4/25) 1:15 pm: local programming	local programming
CBS	local programming					9:30 am: local programming 9:45 am: Morning News (to 10:30 am F)	Arthur Godfrey Time	Bride and Groom (11:15 am from 5/26)/ **Your Surprise Store** (from 5/12, only F until 5/23)		Strike It Rich	12:00 Noon: The Egg and I 12:15 pm: Love of Life	12:30 pm: Search for Tomorrow 12:45 pm: The First Hundred Years	local programming	The Garry Moore Show		2:30 pm: Bride and Groom 2:45 pm: Mike and Buff (variety, from 2/4 from 2:45 pm)		**Bert Parks Show** / The Mel Torme Show (Tu Th)	local programming
NBC	The Today Show				local programming		Breakfast Party (until 5/23)	Winner Take All (to 4/25)	local programming	**It's a Problem**	Ruth Lyons 50 Club	local programming					The Big Payoff	The Ralph Edwards Show (MWF) / **The Johnny Dugan Show** (from 5/19)	The Kate Smith Hour		5:00 pm: Hawkins Falls 5:15 pm: The Gabby Hayes Show	Howdy Doody
DMN	?

== Summer 1952 ==
	7:00 am	7:30 am	8:00 am	8:30 am	9:00 am	9:30 am	10:00 am	10:30 am	11:00 am	11:30 am	noon	12:30 pm	1:00 pm	1:30 pm	2:00 pm	2:30 pm	3:00 pm	3:30 pm	4:00 pm	4:30 pm	5:00 pm	5:30 pm
ABC	local programming
CBS	local programming					9:30 am: local programming 9:45 am: Morning News (to 10:30 am F)	10:00 am: Arthur Godfrey Time (M-Th) 10:45 am: The Al Pearce Show (M-Th, 10:30 am F) 11:15 am: Bride and Groom (M-Th, 11:00 am F)			Strike It Rich	12:00 Noon: The Egg and I (to 8/1) 12:15 pm: Love of Life	12:30 pm: Search for Tomorrow 12:45 pm: **The Guiding Light**	local programming	The Garry Moore Show		2:30 pm: Bride and Groom 2:45 pm: Mike and Buff (variety, from 2/4 from 2:45)		**Summer School** (MWF) / The Mel Torme Show (Tu Th)	local programming
NBC	The Today Show				local programming					It's a Problem	Ruth Lyons 50 Club	local programming					The Big Payoff	The Johnny Dugan Show	**Matinee in New York**		5:00 pm: Hawkins Falls 5:15 pm: The Gabby Hayes Show	Howdy Doody
DMN	?

== By network ==
=== ABC ===
**Returning Series**

**New Series**

- **The Dennis James Show**
- **The Frances Langford-Don Ameche Show**
- **The Gayelord Hauser Show**
- **The Paul Dixon Show**

**Not Returning From 1950-51**

- The Half-Pint Party
- Hold'er Newt
- Lois and Looie
- The Mary Hartline Show
- Mr. Magic and J.J.
- Ozmoe
- Paddy the Pelican
- Space Patrol
- TV Tots Time

=== CBS ===
**Returning Series**

- Action in the Afternoon
- The Big Payoff
- The Bill Cullen Show
- Break the Bank
- Bride and Groom
- CBS News
- CBS Evening News
- The Edge of Night
- The Egg and I
- Face the Nation
- The First Hundred Years
- Freedom Rings
- The Garry Moore Show
- The Guiding Light
- Homemaker's Exchange
- Love of Life
- Meet Your Cover Girl
- The Mel Torme Show
- Morning News
- Search for Tomorrow
- The Steve Allen Show
- Strike It Rich
- The U.N. in Action

**New Series**

- **The Al Pearce Show**
- **Arthur Godfrey Time**
- **Bert Parks Show**
- **The Eddy Arnold Show** *
- **Mike and Buff**
- **Summer School**
- **Whistling Wizard**
- **Your Surprise Store**

**Not Returning From 1950-51**

- All Around the Town
- The Betty Crocker Show
- The Chuck Wagon
- Fashion Magic
- It's Fun to Know
- The Johnny Johnston Show
- Life with Snarky Parker
- Look Your Best
- Lucky Pup
- Robert Q's Matinee
- Two Sleepy People
- Vanity Fair
- The World Is Yours

=== NBC ===
**Returning Series**

- The Bill Cullen Show
- Breakfast Party
- Howdy Doody
- The Kate Smith Hour
- Meet the Press
- NBC News Update
- NBC Saturday Night News
- NBC Sunday Night News
- Strike It Rich
- The Today Show
- Vacation Wonderland

**New Series**

- **The Big Payoff**
- **The Bill Goodwin Show**
- **The Bunch**
- **Dave & Charlie**
- **The Gabby Hayes Show**
- **Here's Looking at You**
- **It's a Problem**
- **It's in the Bag**
- **The Johnny Dugan Show**
- **Kovacs on the Corner**
- **Matinee in New York**
- **The Ralph Edwards Show**
- **Richard Harkness News Review**
- **Ruth Lyons 50 Club**
- **Winner Take All**

**Not Returning From 1950-51**

- America Speaks
- Cowboy Playhouse
- Miss Susan
- The NBC Comics
- Panhandle Pete and Jennifer
- The Ransom Sherman Show
- Remember this Date
- The Straw Hat Matinee

=== DuMont ===
**Not Returning From 1950-51**

- Okay, Mother
- TV Shopper

== See also ==
- 1951-52 United States network television schedule (prime-time)

== Sources ==
- https://web.archive.org/web/20071015122215/http://curtalliaume.com/abc_day.html
- https://web.archive.org/web/20071015122235/http://curtalliaume.com/cbs_day.html
- https://web.archive.org/web/20071012211242/http://curtalliaume.com/nbc_day.html
