= 1950–51 United States network television schedule (daytime) =

The following are the programs for the 1950–1951 United States network television weekday schedule, listing daytime Monday–Friday schedules on four networks for each calendar season from September 1950 to August 1951. All times are Eastern and Pacific. This page is missing info on the DuMont Television Network, which started daytime transmission before any other United States television network. Talk shows are highlighted in yellow, local programming is white, reruns of prime-time programming are orange, game shows are pink, soap operas are chartreuse, news programs are gold and all others are light blue. New series are highlighted in bold.

Note: The DuMont Television Network still missing in the schedules. All Monday–Friday Shows for all networks beginning in September 1950.

== Fall 1950 ==
-	10:30 am	11:00 am	11:30 am	noon	12:30 pm	1:00 pm	1:30 pm	2:00 pm	2:30 pm	3:00 pm	3:30 pm	4:00 pm	4:30 pm	5:00 pm	5:30 pm	6:00 pm
ABC	Local Programming													5:00 pm Mr. Magic and J.J. (to 10/13)/**Lois and Looie** (from 10/16) 5:15 pm: **Paddy the Pelican** (to 10/13)/**Space Patrol** (from 10/16)	5:30 pm **Hold'er Newt** (to 10/13) 5:45 pm **Space Patrol**	Local Programming
CBS	Local Programming						**The Garry Moore Show**		**Robert Q's Matinee**	Local Programming	**Look Your Best** (M & F)/**Meet Your Cover Girl** (Tu & Th or Tu & W)/**The Betty Crocker Show** (Th)/**Fashion Magic** (Tu & F)	Homemaker's Exchange	Vanity Fair	5:00 pm **Lucky Pup** 5:15 pm **Life with Snarky Parker** (to 10/13)/U.N. General Assembly Sessions (to 10/16)	The Chuck Wagon
NBC	Local Programming									**The Ransom Sherman Show**	**The Bert Parks Show** (M W & F)/**Remember this Date** (Tu & Th)	**The Kate Smith Hour**		5:00 pm **The NBC Comics** 5:15 pm **Panhandle Pete and Jennifer**	Howdy Doody	Cactus Jim
DMN	TV Shopper (until 12/1)	?				Okay, Mother	?

== Winter 1950-1951 ==
-	1:00 pm	1:30 pm	2:00 pm	2:30 pm	3:00 pm	3:30 pm	4:00 pm	4:30 pm	5:00 pm	5:30 pm	6:00 pm
ABC	Local Programming							4:30 pm Local Programming 4:45 pm **The Half-Pint Party**	5:00 pm **The Mary Hartline Show** 5:15 pm **TV Tots Time**	Local Programming
CBS	Local Programming	The Garry Moore Show		2:30 pm **The First Hundred Years** 2:45 pm Robert Q's Matinee (to 1/19)/**The Johnny Johnston Show** (1/22-2/9)/**Winner Take All** (M W & F from 2/12) & **Bride and Groom** (Tu & Th from 2/13)		Fashion Magic (M & F), The Betty Crocker Show (Tu & Th) & Meet Your Cover Girl (W)	Homemaker's Exchange	Vanity Fair	5:00 pm Lucky Pup 5:15 pm Local Programming	The Chuck Wagon
NBC	Local Programming				**Vacation Wonderland**	The Bert Parks Show (M W & F) & Remember this Date (Tu & Th)	The Kate Smith Hour		5:00 pm The NBC Comics 5:15 pm The Gabby Hayes Show (M W & F) & Panhandle Pete and Jennifer (Tu & Th)	Howdy Doody	Cactus Jim
DMN	Okay, Mother	?

== Spring 1951 ==
-	noon	12:30 pm	1:00 pm	1:30 pm	2:00 pm	2:30 pm	3:00 pm	3:30 pm	4:00 pm	4:30 pm	5:00 pm	5:30 pm	6:00 pm
ABC	Local Programming									4:30 pm Local Programming 4:45 pm The Half-Pint Party	5:00 pm The Mary Hartline Show (M W & F to 4/13)/**Ozmoe** (Tu & Tu to 4/12)/The Mary Hartline Show & Lois and Looie 5:15 pm TV Tots Time	Local Programming
CBS	**The Steve Allen Show**	Local Programming		The Garry Moore Show		2:30 pm The First Hundred Years 2:45 pm Winner Take All (M W & F to 3:30 pm & Tu & Th to 3:15 pm) Vanity Fair (M W & F to 3:15 pm & Tu & Th 3:30 pm)		Fashion Magic (M & F), The Betty Crocker Show (Tu & Th) & Meet Your Cover Girl (W)	Homemaker's Exchange	It's Fun to Know	5:00 pm Lucky Pup 5:15 pm Local Programming	Local Programming
NBC	Local Programming						3:00 pm **Miss Susan** 3:15 pm A Guest In Your House/Vacation Wonderland/It's Time for Ernie	The Bert Parks Show & Remember this Date	The Kate Smith Hour		5:00 pm **Hawkins Falls, Population 6200** 5:15 pm The Gabby Hayes Show (M W & F) & Panhandle Pete and Jennifer (Tu & Th)	Howdy Doody	Cactus Jim
DMN	?		Okay, Mother	?

== Summer 1951 ==
-	10:30 am	11:00 am	11:30 am	noon	12:30 pm	1:00 pm	1:30 pm	2:00 pm	2:30 pm	3:00 pm	3:30 pm	4:00 pm	4:30 pm	5:00 pm	5:30 pm	6:00 pm
ABC	Local Programming
CBS	Two Sleepy People	Local Programming	**Strike It Rich**	The Steve Allen Show		Local Programming	The Garry Moore Show		2:30 pm The First Hundred Years 2:45 pm Local Programming (M W & F) Vanity Fair (Tu & Th to 3:30 pm) & Bride and Groom (Tu & Th to 3:00 pm)		**All Around the Town** (M W & F), Fashion Magic (Tu & F) & Meet Your Cover Girl (Tu & Th)	Homemaker's Exchange	**The World is Yours**	Local Programs
NBC	Local Programs									3:00 pm Miss Susan 3:15 pm Vacation Wonderland	**America Speaks**	**The Straw Hat Matinee**		5:00 pm Hawkins Falls 5:15 pm **Cowboy Playhouse**	Howdy Doody	Cactus Jim
DMN	?					Okay, Mother (until July 6)	?

== By network ==
=== ABC ===
**Returning Series**

- Mr. Magic and J.J.

**New Series**

- **The Half-Pint Party**
- **Hold'er Newt**
- **Lois and Looie**
- **The Mary Hartline Show**
- **Ozmoe**
- **Paddy the Pelican**
- **Space Patrol**
- **TV Tots Time**

**Not Returning From 1949 to 1950**

=== CBS ===
**Returning Series**

- The Chuck Wagon
- Homemaker's Exchange
- It's Fun to Know
- Two Sleepy People
- U.N. General Assembly Sessions
- Vanity Fair

**New Series**

- **All Around the Town**
- **The Betty Crocker Show**
- **Bride and Groom**
- **Fashion Magic**
- **The First Hundred Years**
- **The Garry Moore Show**
- **The Johnny Johnston Show**
- **Life with Snarky Parker**
- **Look Your Best**
- **Lucky Pup**
- **Meet Your Cover Girl**
- **Robert Q's Matinee**
- **The Steve Allen Show**
- **Strike It Rich**
- **Winner Take All**
- **The World Is Yours**

**Not Returning From 1949 to 1950**

- Classifield Column
- The Ted Steele Show

=== NBC ===
**Returning Series**

- The Bill Cullen Show
- Breakfast Party
- Cactus Jim
- It's Time for Ernie
- Howdy Doody
- The Gabby Hayes Show
- A Guest In Your House
- Howdy Doody
- Meet the Press
- NBC News Update

**New Series**

- **America Speaks**
- **The Bert Parks Show**
- **Cowboy Playhouse**
- **Hawkins Falls, Population 6200**
- **The Kate Smith Hour**
- **Miss Susan**
- **The NBC Comics**
- **Panhandle Pete and Jennifer**
- **The Ransom Sherman Show**
- **Remember this Date**
- **The Straw Hat Matinee**
- **Vacation Wonderland**

**Not Returning From 1949 to 1950**

- Henson Baldwin's War News Digest
- Judy Splinters

=== DuMont ===
**Returning series**

- Okay, Mother
- TV Shopper

**New Series**

**Not Returning From 1949 to 1950**

== See also ==
- 1950-51 United States network television schedule (prime-time)

== Sources ==
- https://web.archive.org/web/20071015122215/http://curtalliaume.com/abc_day.html
- https://web.archive.org/web/20071015122235/http://curtalliaume.com/cbs_day.html
- https://web.archive.org/web/20071012211242/http://curtalliaume.com/nbc_day.html
