= List of works by Steve Allen =

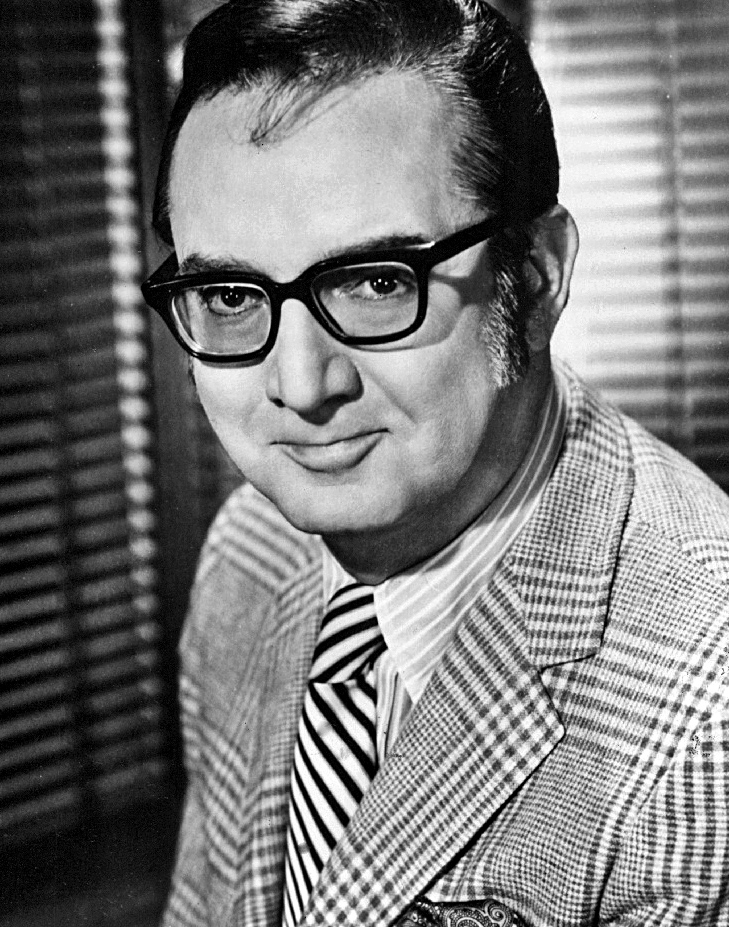
Steve Allen in 1977

This is a list of works by American television personality, musician, composer, actor, comedian, and writer Steve Allen.

== Films ==
- Down Memory Lane (1949)
- The Benny Goodman Story (1956)
- The Big Circus (1959)
- College Confidential (1960)
- Warning Shot (1967)
- Where Were You When the Lights Went Out? (1968)
- The Comic (1969)
- Rich Man, Poor Man (1976)
- Alice in Wonderland (1985)
- The St. Tammany Miracle (1994)

== Shows ==
- Songs for Sale (1950–1952)
- The Steve Allen Show (1950—1952, CBS)
- What's My Line? (regular panelist, 1953–1954; frequent guest panelist 1954–1967)
- Jukebox Jury (1953)
- Talent Patrol (1953–1955)
- The Knickerbocker Beer Show (1953—1955, WNBT, New York)
- Tonight Starring Steve Allen (1954–1957, NBC)
- The Steve Allen Show (1956–61, NBC)
- The Steve Allen Westinghouse Show (1962–1964)
- I've Got a Secret (1964–1967, 1972–1973)
- The Steve Allen Comedy Hour (June 14 — August 23, 1967, CBS)
- The Steve Allen Show (Filmways production, 1968–1969)
- Steve Allen Show (September 29, 1970 – October 21, 1971, KTLA)
- The Allen Show (1971–72)
- Match Game (panelist, 1974)
- Tattletales (panelist, mid-1970s)
- Meeting of Minds (1977–1981, PBS)
- Steve Allen Comedy Hour (1980–1981, NBC)
- The Start of Something Big (1985–1986)
- Amen (1991, Lights, Camera, Deacon Season 5 episode 9)
- The Simpsons (1992, "Separate Vocations", 1995, "'Round Springfield")
- Space Ghost Coast to Coast (1997, one episode, Guest)
- Homicide: Life on the Street (1998): Steve and Jayne appeared as guests (January 16, 1998).
- Sabrina the Teenage Witch (April 3, 1998, Season 2 Episode 21 "Fear Strikes Up a Conversation", Guest)
- Diagnosis Murder (1999, Season 7 Episode 1 The Roast, Ray Masters)

== Songs ==
- "Cool Yule"
- "The Gravy Waltz"
- "Impossible"
- "Let's Go to Church (Next Sunday Morning)"
- "Theme from Picnic"
- "Playing the Field"
- "Pretend You Don't See Her, My Heart"
- "The Saturday Evening Post"
- "This Could Be the Start of Something Big"

== Comedic discography ==
- Man in the Street (1963; Signature 1004)
- Funny Fone Calls (1963; Dot 3472, re-issued as Casablanca 811-366-1-ML)
- More Funny Fone Calls (1963; Dot 3517, re-issued as Casablanca 811-367-1-ML)

== Musical discography ==
- Steve Allen's All Star Jazz Concert Vol. 1 with Lawson-Haggart Jazz Band, Billy Butterfield Jazz Band (Decca, 1954)
- Steve Allen's All Star Jazz Concert Vol. 2 with Lawson-Haggart Jazz Band, Billy Butterfield Jazz Band (Decca, 1954)
- Music for Tonight (Coral, 1955)
- Jazz for Tonight (Coral, 1955)
- Steve Sings (Coral, 1955)
- The Steve Allen Show (Coral, 1955)
- Allen Plays Allen (Coral, 1956)
- The James Dean Story with Bill Randle (Coral, 1956)
- Steve Allen Plays Benny Goodman (Coral, 1956)
- Romantic Rendezvous with Neal Hefti (Coral, 1957)
- Venetian Serenade (Coral, 1957)
- Terry Gibbs, Captain with Terry Gibbs (Mercury, 1958)
- Steve Allen Plays Hi-Fi Music for Influentials (Coral, 1958)
- The Poetry of Love (Coral, 1958)
- What Is Subud with John Bennett (Hanover, 1958)
- Steve Allen Plays Neal Hefti (Coral, 1958)
- Anthony Plays Allen with Ray Anthony (Capitol, 1958)
- Man On the Street with Tom Poston, Don Knotts, Louis Nye (Signature, 1959)
- The Discovery of Buck Hammer (Hanover, 1959)
- Steve Allen Presents Carole Simpson: Singin' and Swingin' (Tops, 1959)
- Steve Allen Presents Sandy Warner: Fair & Warner (Tops, 1959)
- Poetry for the Beat Generation with Jack Kerouac (Hanover, 1959)
- Steve Allen at the Roundtable (Roulette, 1959)
- Swingin' & Dancin' with Gus Bivona (Mercury, 1959)
- Steve Allen Plays (Dot, 1959)
- Around the World (Dot, 1959)
- Monday Nights (Signature, 1960)
- Steve Allen Presents Terry Gibbs at the Piano (Signature, 1960)
- Steve Allen Presents 12 Golden Hits (Dot, 1962)
- Steve Allen Plays Bossa Nova Jazz (Dot, 1963)
- Plays the Piano Greats (Dot, 1963)
- Gravy Waltz and 11 Current Hits! (Dot, 1963)
- Steve Allen Sings (Dot, 1963)
- More (Theme from "Mondo Cane") (Dot, 1963)
- Steve Allen's Funny Fone-Calls (Dot, 1963)
- Some of My Favorites (Hamilton 1964)
- Songs from the Steve Allen TV Show (Dot, 1964)
- Poetry in Piano (Coral, 1964)
- I Play for You (Dot, 1965)
- His Piano & Orchestra (Dot, 1965)
- Cool, Quiet Bossa Nova (Dot, 1967)
- Do the Love with Bob Thiele (ABC, 1967)
- Steve Allen And The Gentle Players – Songs For Gentle People (Dunhill, 1967)
- Soulful Brass with Oliver Nelson (Impulse!, 1968)
- A Man Called Dagger (Music from the Original Soundtrack) (MGM 1968)
- Soulful Brass #2 (Flying Dutchman, 1969)
- Soulful Brass #3 (Flying Dutchman, 1971)
- Steve Allen Presents Linda Guymon (Dobre 1978)
- Funny Fone Calls (Casablanca, 1983)
- Steve Allen's More Funny Fone Calls (Casablanca, 1983)
- Alice in Wonderland Original Cast Voice Track Recording (1985)
- Steve Allen Plays Jazz Tonight (Concord Jazz, 1993)

== Books ==
Year	Title	Notes	Identifiers
1955	Steve Allen's Bop Fables	Illustrated by George Price	OCLC 1006762
1955	Fourteen for Tonight	Short stories	OCLC 1034835
1956	The Funny Men		OCLC 329974
1956	Wry on the Rocks	Poems	OCLC 1150685
1958	The Girls on the 10th Floor and Other Stories	Short stories	OCLC 1131890; ISBN 0-8369-3608-6 (1970 printing)
1959	The Question Man...	Photographs by Gene Lester	OCLC 1150647
1960	Mark It and Strike It: An Autobiography		OCLC 25533614
1962	Not All of Your Laughter, Not All of Your Tears	Steve's first novel	OCLC 1626391
1964	Dialogues in Americanism	Transcript of three debates: Allen vs. William F. Buckley, Jr.; Robert M. Hutchins vs. L. Brent Bozell, and James MacGregor Burns vs. Willmoore Kendall	OCLC 397431
1965	Letter to a Conservative		OCLC 1150594
1966	The Ground is Our Table	Photographs by Arthur Dubinsky	OCLC 358823
1967	Bigger than a Breadbox	With commentary by Leonard Feather; illustrations by Rowland B. Wilson	OCLC 717481
1969	A Flash of Swallows: New Poems	Poems	ISBN 0-8375-6734-3; OCLC 5024
1972	The Wake		ISBN 0-385-07608-8
1973	Princess Snip-Snip and the Puppy-Kittens	Illustrated by David Gantz	
1973	Curses! or... How Never to Be Foiled Again	Illustrated by Marvin Rubin	ISBN 0-87477-008-4
1974	What To Say When It Rains		ISBN 0-8431-0357-4
1975	Schmock-Schmock!		ISBN 0-385-09664-X
1978	Meeting of Minds		ISBN 0-517-53383-9; 1989 printing: ISBN 0-87975-550-4
1978	Chopped-Up Chinese		
1979	Ripoff: A Look at Corruption in America	With Roslyn Bernstein and Donald H. Dunn	ISBN 0-8184-0249-0
1979	Meeting of Minds, Second Series		ISBN 0-517-53894-6; 1989 printing: ISBN 0-87975-565-2
1980	Explaining China		ISBN 0-517-54062-2
1981	Funny People		ISBN 0-8128-2764-3
1982	Beloved Son: A Story of the Jesus Cults		ISBN 0-672-52678-6
1982	More Funny People		ISBN 0-8128-2884-4
1986	How to Make a Speech		ISBN 0-07-001164-8
1987	How to Be Funny: Discovering the Comic You	With Jane Wollman	ISBN 0-07-001199-0; 1992 printing: ISBN 0-87975-792-2; 1998 revised edition: ISBN 1-57392-206-4
1989	The Passionate Nonsmoker's Bill of Rights: The First Guide to Enacting Nonsmoking Legislation	With Bill Adler, Jr.	ISBN 0-688-06295-4
1989	"Dumbth": And 81 Ways to Make Americans Smarter		ISBN 0-87975-539-3; 1998 revised edition: ISBN 1-57392-237-4
1989	Meeting of Minds, Vol. III		ISBN 0-87975-566-0
1989	Meeting of Minds, Vol. IV		ISBN 0-87975-567-9
1990	The Public Hating: A Collection of Short Stories		ISBN 0-942637-22-4
1990	Steve Allen on the Bible, Religion & Morality		ISBN 0-87975-638-1
1992	Hi-Ho, Steverino: The Story of My Adventures in the Wonderful Wacky World of Television		ISBN 0-942637-55-0; large-print edition: ISBN 1-56054-521-6
1993	More Steve Allen on the Bible, Religion & Morality		ISBN 0-87975-736-1
1993	Make 'em Laugh		ISBN 0-87975-837-6
1994	Reflections		ISBN 0-87975-904-6
1995	The Man Who Turned Back the Clock, and Other Short Stories		ISBN 1-57392-002-9
1995	The Bug and the Slug in the Rug		ISBN 1-880851-17-2
1996	But Seriously...: Steve Allen Speaks His Mind		ISBN 1-57392-090-8
1999	Steve Allen's Songs: 100 Lyrics with Commentary		ISBN 0-7864-0736-0
2000	Steve Allen's Private Joke File		ISBN 0-609-80672-6
2001	Vulgarians at the Gate: Trash TV and Raunch Radio—Raising the Standards of Popular Culture		ISBN 1-57392-874-7

Allen was the credited author of a series of mystery novels "starring" himself and wife Jayne Meadows as amateur detectives. The first one (The Talk Show Murders) was ghostwritten by Walter J. Sheldon; later volumes were ghostwritten by Robert Westbrook.

- The Talk Show Murders (1982), ISBN 0-440-08471-7
- Murder on the Glitter Box (1989), ISBN 0-8217-2752-4
- Murder in Manhattan (1990), ISBN 0-8217-3033-9
- Murder in Vegas (1991), ISBN 0-8217-3462-8
- The Murder Game (1993), ISBN 0-8217-4115-2
- Murder on the Atlantic (1995), ISBN 0-8217-4647-2
- Wake Up to Murder (1996), ISBN 1-57566-090-3
- Die Laughing (1998), ISBN 1-57566-241-8
- Murder in Hawaii (1999), ISBN 1-57566-375-9

== Skeptic magazine ==
As Allen was a supporter of the scientific skepticism movement, he worked to promote critical thinking, contributing many pieces to the American magazine Skeptic, which is published by the California-based Skeptics Society.

- Skeptic Vol. 1, No. 1, "A Tribute to Isaac Asimov" (with Harlan Ellison and Martin Gardner)
- Skeptic Vol. 1, No. 2
- Skeptic Vol. 1, No. 3
- Skeptic Vol. 1, No. 4
- Skeptic Vol. 2, No. 1, "Genius" (with James Randi, Paul MacCready, Marilyn vos Savant, Elie Shneour, and David Alexander)
- Skeptic Vol. 2, No. 2, "The Jesus Cults"
- Skeptic Vol. 2, No. 3
- Skeptic Vol. 2, No. 4
- Skeptic Vol. 3, No. 1
- Skeptic Vol. 3, No. 2
- Skeptic Vol. 3, No. 3
- Skeptic Vol. 3, No. 4
- Skeptic Vol. 4, No. 1
- Skeptic Vol. 4, No. 2
- Skeptic Vol. 4, No. 3
- Skeptic Vol. 4, No. 4
- Skeptic Vol. 5, No. 1
  - "An Open Letter from Steve Allen to Heber Jentzsch, President, Church of Scientology"
  - "But Seriously … Steve Allen Speaks His Mind"
- Skeptic Vol. 5, No. 2
- Skeptic Vol. 5, No. 3, "Scientology Reply to Steve Allen"
- Skeptic Vol. 5, No. 4
