= Hitchhike to Happiness =

1945 film by Joseph Santley

- Directed by: Joseph Santley
- Written by: Jerry Horwin; Manuel Seff; Jack Townley
- Produced by: Donald H. Brown
- Starring: Al Pearce; Dale Evans; Brad Taylor; William Frawley
- Cinematography: Jack A. Marta
- Edited by: Fred Allen
- Music by: Morton Scott; R. Dale Butts (additional music-uncredited); Joseph Dubin (uncredited); Walter Scharf (stock music-uncredited); Marlin Skiles (additional music-uncredited); Stanley Wilson (uncredited)
- Production company: Republic Pictures
- Distributed by: Republic Pictures
- Release date: July 16, 1945
- Running time: 74 minutes
- Country: United States
- Language: English

Hitchhike to Happiness is a 1945 American musical film directed by Joseph Santley and starring Al Pearce, Dale Evans and Jerome Cowan. It was nominated at the 18th Academy Awards in the category of Best Musical score. which Morton Scott was nominated for. It was produced and distributed by Republic Pictures.

== Plot ==
A famous radio singer returns to New York City to reunite with her old friends who are unaware of who she is due to how she uses a stage name. She falls in love with a struggling songwriter as well.

== Cast ==
- Al Pearce as Kipling 'Kippy' Ellis
- Dale Evans as Alice Chase
- Brad Taylor as Joe Mitchell
- William Frawley as Sandy Hill
- Jerome Cowan as Tony Riggs
- Willie Trenk as Ladislaus Prenska
- Arlene Harris as Dolly Ward
- Joyce Compton as Joan Randall
- Maude Eburne as Mrs. Randall
- Irving Bacon as Dennis Colby
