= Cora Baird =

American puppeteer (1912–1967)

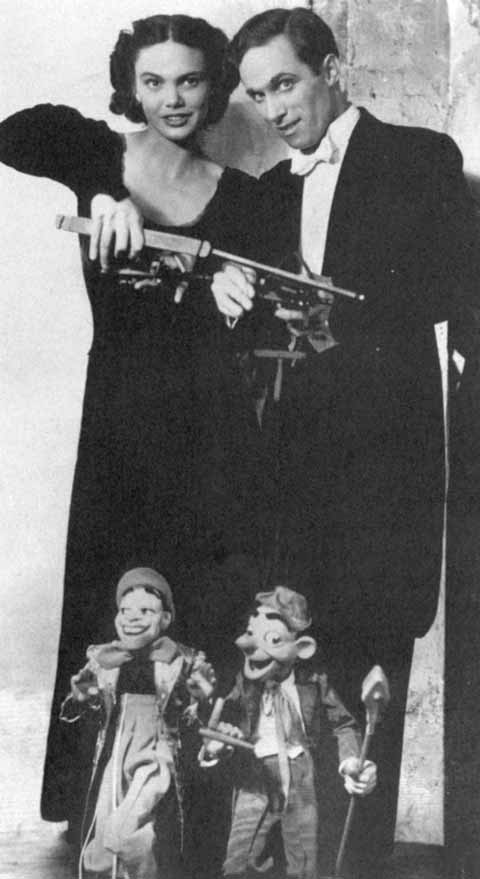
- Cora and Bil Baird performing marionettes in the 1940s
- Born: Cora Eisenberg; January 26, 1912
- Died: December 7, 1967 (aged 55)
- Education: Hunter College
- Occupation: Puppeteer
- Employer(s): Bil and Cora Baird Marionettes
- Known for: Puppet performance during The Lonely Goatherd song in The Sound of Music, and nationally televised puppet performances on TV
- Spouse: Bil Baird
- Children: Peter Baird, Laura Janee (née Baird) Brundage

Cora Baird (January 26, 1912 – December 7, 1967; née Eisenberg, stage name Cora Burlar) was an American puppeteer who started her career as an actor on Broadway. She is best known for puppeteering in The Lonely Goatherd segment of The Sound of Music, and for numerous TV appearances as a puppeteer with her husband Bil Baird.

== Early life ==
Baird was born in New York City to Morris and Anne (née Burlar) Eisenberg. She was the youngest of eight children. Baird's parents were both of Jewish descent, and Yiddish was their native language. Morris was from Russia and Anne from Austria. Before marriage, Cora attended Hunter College, studied dance with Martha Graham, and was a member of the Group Theatre in New York.

== Stage acting ==
Baird appeared in four Broadway productions under the stage name Cora Burlar from age 19 to 25:

Year	Production	Broadway Theater	Role	Type	Notes
1931	Nikki	Longacre Theatre	Ensemble	Musical	Musical director Jules Lenzberg
1934-1935	Valley Forge	Guild Theater	Lady	Historical drama	Staged by John Housman
1935	Noah	Longacre	Sella	Fantasy drama	Produced and staged by Jerome Mayer with Pierre Fresnay as Noah
1937	Dr. Faustus	Maxine Elliott's Theatre	Envy puppet voice	Tragedy	Staged by Orson Welles with Welles as Dr. Faustus. A W.P.A. Federal Theater Project.

== Puppeteering ==
Cora Baird met Bil Baird while working on Dr. Faustus. Orson Welles had commissioned Bil to create and manipulate the Seven Deadly Sins puppets, and Cora was hired to voice the Envy puppet. Four weeks after meeting, they married on January 13, 1937. Soon afterwards, they formed the Bil and Cora Baird Marionettes company and worked as a puppeteering team, with Cora as a full partner in puppet design, creation, and performing.

Prior to meeting Cora, Bil Baird had worked with Tony Sarg on the 1928 Macy's Thanksgiving Day parade, founded Baird Marionettes, nationally toured his puppet show Ali Baba and the Forty Thieves for 40 weeks, and performed at the Chicago World's Fair in 1933.

Cora Baird's most famous work was on The Sound of Music (released April 1, 1965), which won five Oscars, including best picture. Both Bairds puppeteered in The Lonely Goatherd song.

=== Television ===
Baird performed as a puppeteer in over 20 TV productions from 1950 to 1963. The Baird Marionettes were covered in Time magazine on December 29, 1958.

Year	Production	Details	Synopsis	Notes
1950	Life with Snarky Parker	2 episodes, premier January 9, 1950	The adventures of Deputy Sheriff Snarky Parker and his horse Heathcliff in the town of Hotrock in the 1850s. All-marionette, full-color motion picture.	Produced and directed by Yul Brynner. One of the early children's programs on network television. The Miami Herald: Probably the most ingenious puppets to be seen anywhere on television.
1951	The Whistling Wizzard	6 episodes, premier January 26, 1952	The Spider Lady, a modern villainess, says "Elia Kazan" to cast her spells. Her assistant, Kohlrabi, imitates the voice of Yul Brynner of The King and I	All voices performed by the Bairds. Cora voices the Spider Lady and J.P. The Bairds...achieve a real sense of life-like dimension and actuality by humanizing not only the figures themselves, which is fairly common, but also their production approach to the little characters on strings. The result is to enhance fantasy by adding to its plausibility.
1952	Christmas Eve Show on WNBT	1 show, December 24, 1952	Christmas music from 11:15 PM to midnight.	Guests: Ezio Pinza, Jane Pickens, Alice Dennis King, and the Bil and Cora Baird Marionettes. Meredith Willson conducted the orchestra and chorus.
1952	Danger: Death Pulls the Strings	1 episode, December 30, 1952	Murder mystery drama (early use of background music)	Charles Russell producer, Julian Koenig writer.
1953	The Arthur Murray Party (ABC)	Season 4, episode 37, November 16, 1953	Showcased popular party dance styles	Presented by hosts Arthur Murray and Kathryn Murray. Directed by Coby Ruskin, with special guest Groucho Marx.
1954	The Morning Show with Walter Cronkite (CBS)	Weekdays 7 to 9 AM	Amongst hard news reports, Walter Cronkite joshed with puppets Humphrey the Hound Dog and Charlemane, the Lion to create comic relief.	The Bil and Cora Baird puppets performed four times daily. Cora Baird performed Humphry and Bil Baird performed Charlemane. Their satirical pantomimes of popular songs can be extremely amusing ... the Bairds provide what sparkle there is to The Morning Show.
1954	The Today Show (NBC)	Weekdays 7 to 9 AM	Holiday season special presentation, December 27 to 31.	Televised live from the Baird's studio on 334 West Seventieth Street.
1955	Babes in Toyland (NBC)	TV Movie, December 18, 1954	Live treatment of the 1903 Christmas-themed operetta composed by Victor Herbert. A young girl is lost in a department store during Christmas shopping rush. She is comforted by a department store Santa who tells her the tale of Tommy Tucker's love for Jane Piper and the cold-hearted villainy of Silas Barnaby.	Produced and directed by Max Liebman. Broadcast in color, but most viewers had black and white TVs at the time. The decided heroes of "Babes in Toyland" were Cora and Bil Baird, the puppeteers. Their animated little figures of toys and animals were the complete embodiment of delightful fantasy-humorous, imaginative and beguiling lifelike. In the familiar "March of the Toys," for instance, the puppet soldiers handled by the Bairds were infinitely more intriguing-and much better drilled-than the complementary corps of humans costumed as soldiers.
1955	Studio One, The Prince and the Puppet (CBS)	Season 7, episode 47, August 8, 1955	A pair of puppeteers seek funds for a tour and do a show for a wealthy man's party with unusual results.	Directed by Seymour Robbie, written by Shirley Peterson. Studio One received eighteen Emmy nominations and five wins during its nine-year run. This episode had Betty Furness as commercial spokeswoman.
1955	Max Liebman Spectaculars, Heidi	Season 7, episode 47, October 1, 1955	Orphan girl left in gruff, hermit grandfather's care, then becomes companion for injured girl.	Max Liebman director, adaption writers Neil Simon, Billy Friedberg. Stars Jeannie Carson as young orphan girl, Richard Eastham as grandfather. Other cast: Wally Cox, Elsa Lanchester, Jo Van Fleet, and Natalie Wood.
1956	Adventures in Numbers and Space	TV Movie, premier November 18, 1956	Baird Marionettes perform Snarkey, Gargle, and other puppets in this educational math and science show. Cora Baird credited as puppeteer.	Produced by Westinghouse Broadcasting in collaboration with Teachers College, Columbia University. With puppeteers Frank Sullivan and Franz Fazakas.
1957	The Strange Case of the Cosmic Rays	TV Movie: release October 25, 1957	Charles Dickens, Edgar Allan Poe, and Feedor Doestoevski played by Baird Marionettes	Directors Frank Capra and William T. Hurtz, writers Jonathan Latimer and Frank Capra. Produced by Bell Laboratories, The Bell System Science Series. Nominated for an Emmy for Best Public Service Program or Series in 1958.
1957	Tonight Starring Jack Paar (NBC)	1 show, December 4, 1957	Late night talk show appearance	Guests: Bil and Cora Baird and their puppets, comedian Shecky Green and jazz vocalist Blossom Dearie
1958	Art Carney Meets Peter and the Wolf (ABC)	1 show November 30, 1958	Comedy special	Producer Burt Shevelove, executive producer John Green, director Dick Feldman, assistant director Edith J. Johnson. Lyrics by Ogden Nash, music by Paul Weston, book by Andy J. Russell. Nominated for three primetime Emmys. Art Carney was the only visible human in the show. Rehearsed with Carney in the Baird's theater. In the back of the room a hive of Baird employees was at work refurbishing old puppets and creating new ones. As Mr. Carney ran through his lines, the sound of sandpaper being applied vigorously against wood provided a rasping accompaniment. Art Carney Meets Peter and the Wolf (ABC) proved to be one of the most engaging shows ever to be seen on TV... the wonder of the hour-long show was Bil and Cora Baird's 50 animal puppets, who achieved something rare—a fairy tale mixed with true gaiety, a child's world edged by real irony.
1959	Bell Telephone Hour: Adventures in Music (NBC)	Season 1, episode 1, January 12, 1959	Maurice Evans narrates Ogden Nash verses of Camille Saint-Saens Carnival of the Animals featuring the Baird Marionettes	William Nichols producer, Dan Lounsbery executive producer, William Colleran director. Episode stars included Harry Belafonte.
1959	Art Carney Meets the Sorcerer's Apprentice (ABC)	1 show April 5, 1959	Comedy special	Original calssic by Paul Dukas. Script by A. J. Russell, composed by Paul Weston, lyrics by Ogden Nash, director Seymour Robbie. The show strove valiantly for the light touch of make-believe but the result was disconcertingly heavy-handed and confused...Bil and Cora Baird manipulated the marionettes with their accustomed skill; the maneuvers of the toy soldiers were particularly fine.
1959	Garry Moore Show (CBS)	1 show November 24, 1959	Jack and Jill (the Bairds puppets) are interviewed by Durward Kirby (in the role of Edward R. Kirby) on People to People	Even the puppets are satirizing flesh-and-blood television performers. Bil and Cora Baird have a character called Edward R. Bow-wow, a chain-smoking airedale.
1959	Art Carney Meets Peter and the Wolf (ABC)	1 show November 29, 1959	Comedy special rerun	Sponsored by the Minnesota Mining and Manufacturing Company. Described as an enchanting hour for children and adults.
1960	Shirley Temple's Storybook, Winnie-the-Pooh	Season 2, episode 3; October 2, 1960	Musical. Pooh stories: Winnie the Pooh and the Honey Tree, Eeyore Loses a Tail, Winnie the Pooh in the Rabbit Hole, Tigger, and A Birthday Party for Eeyore. All Pooh characters played by Baird marionettes.	Starring Shirley Temple (as Mother), Teddy Eccles (as Christopher Robin), Faz Fazakas (as Pooh voice). Kanga voice by Baird.
1961	Bell Telephone Hour, A Trip to Christmas (NBC)	Season 4, episode 6, December 22, 1961	Baird Marionettes: Night Before Christmas segment	Jane Wyatt as hostess.
1961	The Chevy Show: O'Halloran's Luck (NBC)	March 12, 1961	A musical adaptation of Stephen Vincent Benet's story about an Irish immigrant who becomes a U.S. railroad tycoon with the assistance of a displaced leprechaun.	Art Carney Stars. Book by A. J. Russell, lyrics by Dianne Lampert and Pete Farrow. The leprechaun Rory and his friends are portrayed by the Baird Marionettes.
1963	Bell Telephone Hour (NBC)	December 24, 1963	A program of Christmas music and dance.	Donald Voorhees conducts the Bell Telephone Orchestra. Guests are Jane Wyatt, Phyllis Curtin, Lois Hunt, Earl Wrightson, Bil and Cora Baird Marionettes, Kirsten Simone and Henning Kronstam, the Columbus Boy-choir, and the Buster Davis Singers.

=== Broadway ===
Baird was a puppeteer in eight Broadway theater productions from 1943 to 1959. She was credited variously as Cora Baird, Bil and Cora Baird Marionettes, Baird Marionettes, or Bil Baird Marionettes.

Year	Production	Broadway Theater	Baird Role	Type	Shows (#)	Notes
1943 - 1944	Ziegfeld Follies of 1943	Winter Garden Theatre	Performer	Musical review	553	Music by Ray Henderson, lyrics by Jack Yellen, featuring Milton Berle, Ilona Massey, and Arthur Treacher
1951	Flahooley	Broadhurst Theatre	Mirabelle	Musical	40	Bil and Cora Baird performed the opening song You Too Can Be a Puppet, which lampooned McCarthy era politics. The original cast recording was released by Capitol Records. The puppets themselves are generally superb and in some instances are fit to be ranked, in their boisterous way, of course, even with those of Teschner for sheer puppet excellence.
1955	Ali Baba and the Forty Thieves and Review	Phoenix Theater Sideshow series	The Spider Lady, others	Musical	11	Special Christmas week attraction, part of Sideshow. Ali Baba music by George Kleinsinger, lyrics by Joe Darion, script by Bil Baird and Allan Stern. Review included Heathcliff, the talking horse; Bubbles LaRue, stripteaser extraordinaire; Groovy, a rabbi disk-jockey, and The Spider Lady, who casts spells with such utterances as "Elia Kazan." Bil and Cora Baird could only get a row "O" seat for son Peter Baird, age 4, because the program was a hit.
1956	Ali Baba and the Forty Thieves	Playhouse Theater	Puppeteer	Musical	18	Book by Bil Baird and Allan Stern, directed by Burt Shevelove, songs and dances by George Keinsinger, lyrics by Jo Darion. Other puppeteers: Bil Baird, Frank Sullivan, Franz Fazakas, Carl Harms and Ray Hedge.
1959	Davy Jones' Locker	Morosco Theater	Miranda marionette performer	Musical	1	Directed by Burt Shevelove, book by Arthur Burns, produced by Arthur Cantor and Joseph Harris. Bil Baird's brother George was also a performer.
1959	Davy Jones' Locker	Hudson Theater	Miranda marionette performer	Musical	1	Repeat of the Morosco Theater production.
1963	Man in the Moon	Biltmore Theatre	Chandra	Musical	7	Music by Jerry Bock, lyrics by Sheldon Harnick, book by Arthur Burns. Bil Baird's brother George was also a performer.
1967	Stravinsky	Lincoln Center, Philharmonic Hall	Puppeteer	Concert	1	Chamber Symphony of Philadelphia conducted by Anshel Brusilow. Morris Carnovsky was narrator, with action provided by the Bil and Cora Baird marionettes.

=== Bill & Cora Baird Marionette Theater ===
The Bil & Cora Baird Theater was located at 59 Barrow Street in Greenwich Village starting in 1964. Their family living space was above the theater. As a full partner in the theater, Baird had various roles including performer, creator, front of house, and administrator. And she kept Peter Baird engaged in the family business. Below is a partial list of the Baird productions that were covered in the press:

Year	Production	Role	Notes
1962	India, Afghanistan, and Nepal Tour	Puppet creator and performer	17-week tour.
1963	Russia Tour	Puppet creator and performer in Davy Jones' Locker	Facilitated by Sergi Obraztsov, Russia's leading puppeteer. On page 1 of the New York Times: Three and a half tons of special equipment is being packed for the nine-week tour, including 30 hand puppets and 170 stringed marionettes. The tour was sponsored by the State Department as part of a puppet exchange, where Obraztsov Puppet Theater will visit the U.S.A.
1963	Europe Tour	Research puppetry in Europe	Bil and Cora Baird, the American puppeteers who just completed a nine-week tour of the Soviet Union, are now on a research tour of European puppet centers. After exchanging ideas with colleagues in Prague, Budapest, Vienna, Salzburg, and Munich.
1963	Obraztsov US Tour	Facilitate with US audiences	Sergei Obratsov, whose troupe starts an eight-week engagement at the Broadway Theater on Wednesday, was appalled to learn that Americans generally regard puppets as kid stuff.
1964-1965	New York World's Fair, Chrysler Pavilion	Perform and manage numerous puppet shows.	The Baird Company of 63 persons gave 88 performances a day during the 1964 and 1965 seasons of the fair.
1966	13 Stars for Channel 13	Contribute puppet performance to the fund raiser.	About $20,000 was raised by the benefit show from 500 attendees for the NYC educational TV station. Kitty Carlisle and Garry Moore were hosts. Performers included Tallulah Bankhead, Orson Bean, Leonard Bernstein, Henry Fonda, Dick Gregory, George London, Judith Raskin, Chita Rivera, and Tony Tanner. Arthur Cantor was the producer.
1967	The Wonderful O	Baird Marionettes perform this satirical adventure story about two scoundrels, one of whom has a violent dislike of the letter "O."	Adaptation by Louis Solomon.
1967	People is the Thing that the World is Fullest Of	Perform hand and rod puppets.	Adults-only puppet review. Audio recording by Frank Sullivan, Franz Fazakas, Carl Harms, Jerry Nelson, and Phyllis Nierendorf. Two of the numbers ...approach genius.
1967	Davy Jones' Locker	Miranda marionette performer	Adapted from Baird's Marionettes' original Broadway Morosco Theater production.

=== Commercial events ===
The Bairds also did some commercial work. A few of these were:

Year	Event	Venue	Sponsor	Synopsis	Notes
1944	Life with Snarky Parker	Short films	Coordinator of Inter-American Affairs for distribution in Central and South America	Gardening Is Fun: Encourage Latin American farmers to grow tomatoes, peas, string beans, carrots, potatoes, and radishes. A Boy and His Cow: Celebrate the dairy cow.	All props, sets, and actors by Bill and Cora Baird. Cora manipulated the strings to make Snarky walk, run, hoe his garden, drive a cart or plow a field. All-marionette, full-color short films
1947	Fashions of the Times	Times Hall	The New York Times	In a nightmare Cauldron sequence, puppets portrayed a merchandise manager and controller torturing the director into producing a fashion show.	Staged by Abe Feder. The Bairds performed in the Cauldron scene. At one point, they manipulated their marionette strings from 20 feet above the stage.

=== Night clubs ===
Early in their careers as a couple, the Bairds performed in night clubs. A few of these were:

Year	Venue
1943	Hotel Pierre's Cotillion Room
1944	Persian Room of the Hotel Plaza
1947	Lowe's State Theater

== Personal life ==
Baird married Bil Baird in 1937 when she was 25 years old and he was 33. Baird had two children. Peter Baird was born in 1952 in New York City and Laura Janee Baird was born on April 30, 1955.

== Death ==
Baird died on December 7, 1967 at the age of 54 in a New York City hospital. Despite her illness, she continued to perform until four days prior to her death. Her last performance was in Winnie the Pooh.
