= Peter Baird =

American puppeteer

Peter B. Baird
- Born: February 25, 1952; New York City, U.S.
- Died: July 16, 2004 (aged 52); New York City, U.S.
- Occupation: Puppeteer
- Years active: 1968–2004
- Employer: Bil Baird Marionettes
- Known for: Shining Time Station; Davy Jones' Locker (1987, 1995)
- Spouse: Mavis Humes (m. 2004)
- Parents: Bil Baird (father); Cora Baird (mother)

Peter Britton Baird (February 25, 1952 – July 16, 2004) was an American puppeteer in live theater, feature films, and TV. He also contributed as a director and script writer. Baird is best known for his five-year contribution to the children's TV show Shining Time Station, which won an Emmy. He is also known for reviving some of his parents' most popular puppet shows, such as Davy Jones' Locker, first as a musical for live theater (1987), then as a feature film (1995). He was the son of puppeteers Bil and Cora Baird. Baird received two UNIMA citations of excellence for live performance (1990, 1992).

== Early life ==
Baird was born in New York City to Cora Baird (née Eisenberg) and Bil Baird. Peter was the oldest of two children. His younger sister, Laura Janee Baird, was born three years after him. His parents were career puppeteers and immersed Baird in the world of puppetry, theater, and film at an early age. Baird's mother Cora appeared in multiple Broadway productions under the stage name Cora Burlar, including Valley Forge staged by John Housman in 1934–1935 at the Guild Theater, and Noah with Pierre Fresnay as Noah in 1935.

Baird's father Bil Baird worked with Tony Sarg. One of his early projects with Sarg were giant animal balloons for the 1928 Macy's Thanksgiving Day parade. Bil then formed Baird Marionettes, which performed at the Chicago World's Fair in 1933.

Cora met Bil while working on Orson Welles' stage production of Dr. Faustus. Welles commissioned Bil to create and manipulate puppets to represent the seven deadly sins, and Cora performed the puppet voices. Four weeks after meeting, they married on January 13, 1937. Soon afterwards, they formed Bil & Cora Baird Marionettes and performed continuously and extensively as a team.

Baird's family home was above his parents' marionette theater in Greenwich Village. At age two, Baird was pictured in a newspaper article sitting on his parents' puppet stage as puppets performed around him. The theater had an attic with a playroom. It was designed by Chicagoan Robert Lindenthal, with mushroom-shaped stools, beds on pulleys, a storage box ladder, and, of course, puppets hanging from the walls and ceiling.

Cora and Bil Baird often performed their puppet shows with their children in tow. The venues ranged from the family's theater in Greenwich Village, to New York City vaudeville stages, to the 1939 New York World's Fair Swift Pavilion. Cora and Bil were in the 1941 Broadway production of the Ziegfeld Follies. One of their most famous performances was the Lonely Goatherd in the film version of The Sound of Music in 1964. Puppetry was the dominant context for Baird's youth. Unfortunately, his mother Cora died in 1967 when he was only 15.

== Works ==
Baird's career started with front of house support as a ticket taker at age 11, and became a professional marionette performer at the Bil and Cora Baird Marionette Theater. In 1968 (age 15) his mother died, the family theater was renamed Bil Baird Marionettes, and Peter continued his work there as a puppeteer. In 1979 he had his first involvement in a Hollywood film production. In 1981 Baird worked on his first Broadway production. Afterwards, Baird continued to work in live theater, film and TV. In 1989 he puppeteered on the TV series Shining Time Station that ran for five years. Peter was filmed at a Puppeteers of America National Festival demonstrating puppeteering techniques.

=== Live Theater ===
Year	Production	Venue	Role	Notes
1963 to 1971	Wide range of marionette shows	Bil and Cora Baird Marionettes (Greenwich Village)	Ticket-taker, puppeteer	By age 11 (1963), Baird was a ticket taker at his parents' puppet theater. By age 19 (1971) he was a professional puppeteer and eventually performed in 15 of his parents' productions.
1981	Frankenstein	Palace Theater (Broadway)	Puppet master	Starred John Carradine and Dianne Wiest. Script by Victor Gialanella. Stage effects by Bran Ferren. Peter Baird was puppet master and Bil Baird created the Arctic sequence puppets. Opened on January 4, 1981, and closed the same night. It had a $2 million budget. The next day, Frank Rich's review was eviscerating: just another talky, boring play, magic tricks were actually pointless, and murders were so lamely and impersonally dramatized. The show has been referred to as a legendary Broadway debacle.
1987	Davy Jones' Locker (musical)	Orpheum Theater (East Village)	Director, puppeteer	Off-Boradway musical revived and directed by Baird. Originally produced by Bil and Cora Baird, which debuted in 1959 and performed annually until 1977. Presented by Arthur Cantor, music and lyrics by Mary Rogers, book by Arthur Birnkrant and Waldo Salt, musical arrangements by Alvy West, and artistic consultant Carl Harms. The revived version was presented by Arthur Cantor with: Sean O'Malley as Nick, Randy Carfagno as Billy and a Goon, William Tost as Captain Fletcher Scorn, Baird as Mr. Merriweather and Davy Jones, Pady Blackwood as Paddlefoot, the Sea Monster and a Goon, Sharon Lerner as Miranda.
1988	Pinocchio	Minetta Lane Theater (Greenwich Village)	Director, puppeteer	Originally performed by Bil and Cora Baird Marionettes in a 1959 production by Arthur Cantor and Joseph Harris at the Morosco Theatre. Remounted by Peter Baird. Book by Jerome Coopersmith, music by Mary Rogers, lyrics by Sheldon Harnick, produced by Arthur Cantor. Performances: Baird as Pinocchio, Pady Blackwood as Pierrot and Alex, Randy Carfagno as Cat and Columbine, Larry Engler as Carlos and Policeman, William Tost as Geppetto, Fox, Harlequin, and Magistrate, and Richard Stephen Weber as Mr. Fireball, Mrs. Bluestone, and Policeman.
2002	The Mystery of the Salt Crystal	U.S. school tour	Puppeteer	Baird toured nationally for two months to perform with Lisa Sturz in this Red Herring Puppets production. The show was a STEM offering that combined science, history, and entertainment.

=== Feature Film and TV ===
Year	Production	Venue	Role	Notes
1979	The Muppet Movie	Movie theaters	Additional muppet performer	Directed by James Frawley and produced by Jim Henson. The first theatrical film to feature the Muppets. It earned Academy Award nominations for best musical score and song. Henson's puppeteers visited and trained with Baird's parents when Baird worked there in the 1960s and 1970s. Jim Henson said that Bil Baird had taught him most of what he knew and had trained at least 30 of his puppeteers at the Bairds' Greenwich Village theater.
1984	The Muppets Take Manhattan	Movie theaters	Additional muppet performer (uncredited)	Directed by Frank Oz, who also performed many muppets, including Miss Piggy. Baird was among 36 other uncredited muppet performers. The movie grossed $25.5 million on a budget of $8 million.
1986	Howard the Duck	Movie theaters	Puppeteer	Performed with fellow Howard puppeteers Tim Rose, Lisa Sturz, Mary Wells, and Steve Sleap.
1987	Howling III	Movie theaters	Actor	Directed by Philippe Mora. Baird appeared as an Omega #1 soldier ordered by a General to hunt and kill werewolves in the Australian Outback. Was negatively reviewed in the LA Times. Howling III was the last film in the Howling series.
1989 to 1993	Shining Time Station	TV series	Puppeteer	Shining Time Station was a five-year TV series of children's shows on PBS. Baird manipulated the marionette Grace the Bass for 59 episodes. Grace was a member of the Jukebox Puppet Band. Ringo Starr narrated the first season as Mr. Conductor. George Carlin replaced Starr for the remaining seasons. Carlin described the show for the Television Academy Foundation. The show won one Daytime Emmy in 1989: Matthew Diamond for Outstanding Directing in a Children's Series. It won one Gemini award in 1993 for Best Children's or Youth Fiction Program or Series: Britt Allcroft (executive producer), Rick Siggelkow (executive producer), and Nancy Chapelle (producer). The Juke Box Puppet Band was featured in several videos.
1990	Let Me Hear You Whisper	Made for TV movie	Puppet creator, puppeteer	The play was written by Paul Zindel in 1969 protesting scientific animal experimentation. It was first produced by NET Playhouse, and Baird's father Bil Baird created and performed the dolphin. The 1990 version was directed by George Schaefer. Peter Baird created and performed the talking dolphin. The movie was not well reviewed.
1995	Davy Jones' Locker (movie)	Movie theaters	Co-writer, voices, puppeteer	Baird revived the 1959 and 1987 productions featuring Bil Baird Marionettes. Baird co-wrote the revised screenplay with writer and director Joseph Jacoby. Executive producer Edmond J. Harris and Rowland Perkins, composer Philip Marshall, lyrics by Mark Turnbull. Baird puppeteered and voiced Davy Jones and voiced Patch. Puppeteers from prior Baird productions contributed: Pady Blackwood, William Tost. The movie was initially released to theaters, and then to TV, video, and streaming.
2004	Strings	Movie theaters	Puppeteer	Puppet fantasy film with marionettes as characters. Directed by Anders Rønnow Klarlund. Numerous puppeteers were led by Bernd Ogrodnik of Iceland. Produced in Denmark. The movie used an international team of specialists and became a landmark in the world of Puppet movies, using marionettes in a scope never before attempted. Movie released in September 2004, several months after Baird's death.
2004	Team America: World Police	Movie theaters	Uncredited puppeteer	A puppet comedy film directed by Trey Parker. Co-written by Trey Parker with Matt Stone and Pam Brady. Premiered in October 2004, a few months after Baird's death. The film received one star from Roger Ebert.

== Personal life ==
Baird and his sister Laura Janee (née Baird) Brundage auctioned some of the Bil and Cora Baird puppets at the Greenwich Auction Room. This was to help pay estate taxes after Bil Baird's death in 1987. Baird said puppets are created to be used, not hidden away in boxes, and we are not using them.

Baird married Mavis Humes in early 2004. They remained married until his death in 2004.

== Death ==
Baird died of esophageal cancer at a hospital in the Bronx on July 16, 2004. A memorial was written about Baird by Joseph Jacoby, director of the 1995 movie Davy Jones' Locker. As published in Puppetry International, Jacoby said: I had worked with the best—from Bunin to father Baird—but I'd never witnessed the performance genius of Peter Baird. It was a genius born of an open childlike love for his craft, febrile and all-consuming, and a love for humanity, displayed always with humility, which in my judgment spoke softly of his extraordinary gifts.

== Filmography ==
- The Muppet Movie (1979) - Puppeteer
- The Muppets Take Manhattan (1984) - Additional puppeteer
- Howard the Duck - Howard T. Duck (head operator)
- Howling III (1987) - Omega #1 soldier (actor)
- Shining Time Station (1989–1993) - Grace the Bass puppeteer
- Davy Jones' Locker (1995) - Script co-writer, puppeteer and voice for Davy Jones, voice for Patch
- Strings (2004) - Puppeteer
- Team America: World Police (2004) - Uncredited puppeteer
