= One Exciting Week =

1946 film by William Beaudine

- Theatrical release poster
- Directed by: William Beaudine
- Screenplay by: Jack Townley; John K. Butler
- Story by: Dennis Murray
- Produced by: Donald H. Brown
- Starring: Al Pearce; Pinky Lee; Jerome Cowan; Shemp Howard; Arlene Harris; Mary Treen
- Cinematography: John Alton
- Edited by: William P. Thompson
- Production company: Republic Pictures
- Distributed by: Republic Pictures
- Release date: June 8, 1946
- Running time: 69 minutes
- Country: United States
- Language: English

One Exciting Week is a 1946 American comedy film directed by William Beaudine and written by Jack Townley and John K. Butler. The film stars Al Pearce, Pinky Lee, Jerome Cowan, Shemp Howard, Arlene Harris and Mary Treen. It was released on June 8, 1946 by Republic Pictures.

== Cast ==
- Al Pearce as Dan Flannery
- Pinky Lee as Itchy
- Jerome Cowan as Al Carter
- Shemp Howard as Marvin Lewis
- Arlene Harris as Lottie Pickett
- Mary Treen as Mabel Taylor
- Lorraine Krueger as Helen Pickett
- Maury Dexter as Jimmy Curtis
- Will Wright as Otis Piper
- Arthur Loft as Charlie Pickett
- Chester Clute as Mayor Clarence Teeple
- The Teen-Agers as Musical Ensemble
