= The Main Street Kid =

1948 film by R. G. Springsteen

- Theatrical release poster
- Directed by: R. G. Springsteen
- Screenplay by: Jerry Sackheim; John K. Butler
- Produced by: Sidney Picker
- Starring: Al Pearce; Janet Martin; Alan Mowbray; Adele Mara; Arlene Harris; Emil Rameau
- Cinematography: John MacBurnie
- Edited by: Tony Martinelli
- Music by: Ernest Gold
- Production company: Republic Pictures
- Distributed by: Republic Pictures
- Release date: January 1, 1948
- Running time: 64 minutes
- Country: United States
- Language: English

The Main Street Kid is a 1948 American comedy film directed by R. G. Springsteen and written by Jerry Sackheim and John K. Butler. The film stars Al Pearce, Janet Martin, Alan Mowbray, Adele Mara, Arlene Harris and Emil Rameau. The film was released on January 1, 1948 by Republic Pictures.

== Cast ==
- Al Pearce as Otis Jones
- Janet Martin as Jill Jones
- Alan Mowbray as The Great Martine
- Adele Mara as Gloria
- Arlene Harris as Edie Jones
- Emil Rameau as Max
- Byron Barr as Bud Wheeling
- Douglas Evans as Mark Howell
- Roy Barcroft as Torrey
- Phil Arnold as Riley
- Sarah Edwards as Mrs. Clauson
- Earle Hodgins as Judge Belin
- Dick Elliott as Sam Trotter
