= Here Comes Elmer =

1943 film by Joseph Santley

- Theatrical release poster
- Directed by: Joseph Santley
- Screenplay by: Stanley Davis; Jack Townley
- Produced by: Armand Schaefer
- Starring: Al Pearce; Dale Evans; Frank Albertson; Gloria Stuart; Wally Vernon; Nick Cockrane
- Cinematography: Bud Thackery
- Edited by: Richard L. Van Enger
- Music by: Marlin Skiles
- Production company: Republic Pictures
- Distributed by: Republic Pictures
- Release date: November 15, 1943
- Running time: 74 minutes
- Country: United States
- Language: English

Here Comes Elmer is a 1943 American comedy film directed by Joseph Santley and written by Stanley Davis and Jack Townley. The film stars Al Pearce, Dale Evans, Frank Albertson, Gloria Stuart, Wally Vernon and Nick Cockrane. The film was released on November 15, 1943, by Republic Pictures.

== Cast ==
- Al Pearce as Elmer Blurt / Al Pearce
- Dale Evans as Jean Foster
- Frank Albertson as Joe Maxwell
- Gloria Stuart as Glenda Forbes
- Wally Vernon as Wally
- Nick Cockrane as Nick Cochrane
- Will Wright as Horace Parrot
- Thurston Hall as P. J. Ellis
- Ben Welden as Louis Burch
- Chester Clute as Postelwaite
- Luis Alberni as Dr. Zichy
- Artie Auerbach as Kitzel
