= Will Wright (actor) =

American character actor (1894–1962)

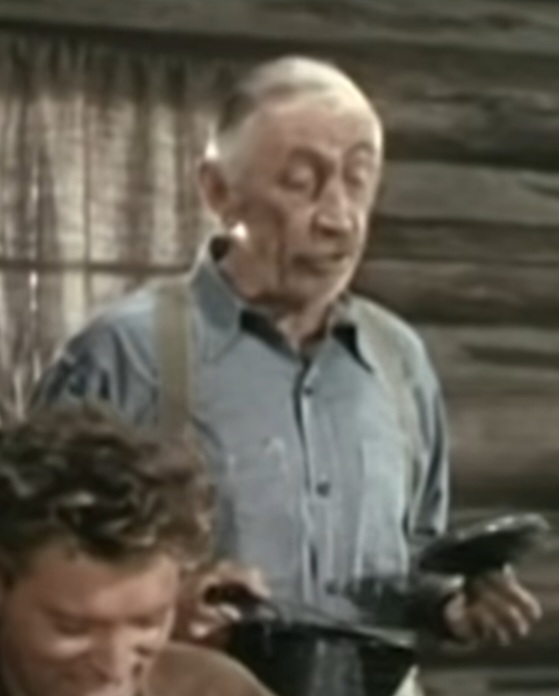
- Wright in Vengeance Valley (1951)
- Born: William Henry Wright; March 26, 1894; San Francisco, California, U.S.
- Died: June 19, 1962 (aged 68); Los Angeles, California, U.S.
- Occupation: Actor
- Years active: 1920–1962

William Henry Wright (March 26, 1894 – June 19, 1962) was an American actor. He was frequently cast in Westerns and as a curmudgeonly and argumentative old man. Over the course of his career, Wright appeared in more than 200 film and television roles.

== Career ==
Born in San Francisco, Wright worked as a newspaperman before beginning a career in show business. He started his acting career in vaudeville and later moved to the stage. Wright also worked in radio, appearing in more than 5,000 radio programs. His radio performances have included Zeb on Al Pearce and His Gang, George Honeywell in My Little Margie, Mahoney on Glamour Manor and the title character, Ephraim Tutt in The Amazing Mr. Tutt. He also guest starred on radio shows, such as The Man Called X, The Charlotte Greenwood Show and The Jack Benny Program (he later appeared on the television version of the program).

Wright made his west coast film debut in 1940 in Blondie Plays Cupid. In 1942, he provided the voice of Friend Owl in Walt Disney's animated film Bambi. Wright also had roles in Shadow of the Thin Man (1941) with William Powell and Myrna Loy, The Major and the Minor (1943) with Ginger Rogers and Ray Milland, So Proudly We Hail! (1943) with Claudette Colbert, Paulette Goddard and Veronica Lake, Road to Utopia (1946) with Bing Crosby and Bob Hope, Mother Wore Tights (1947) with Betty Grable, Mr. Blandings Builds His Dream House (1948) with Cary Grant and Myrna Loy, Little Women (1949) with Elizabeth Taylor, Walk Softly, Stranger (1950) with Joseph Cotten, Sunset in the West (1950) with Roy Rogers, People Will Talk (1951) with Cary Grant, The Happy Time (1952) with Charles Boyer, River of No Return (1954) with Robert Mitchum and Marilyn Monroe, The Man with the Golden Arm (1955) with Frank Sinatra and Kim Novak, Jeanne Eagels (1957) with Kim Novak, and Gunman's Walk (1958) with Van Heflin.

He portrayed Dolph Pillsbury in the Academy Award-winning picture, All the King's Men with Broderick Crawford.

During the 1950s, he guest-starred on several television series, including I Love Lucy with Lucille Ball, Desi Arnaz, William Frawley and Vivian Vance, Schlitz Playhouse of Stars, Where's Raymond?, The Bob Cummings Show, Our Miss Brooks, Mr. Adams and Eve, Father Knows Best with Robert Young and Jane Wyatt, The Millionaire, Circus Boy with Noah Beery Jr., Fury with Peter Graves, “Jeff’s Collie” (Lassie) in the episode “The Trial”, The Real McCoys with Walter Brennan, The Donna Reed Show, The Restless Gun with John Payne, Lawman with John Russell, Tales of Wells Fargo with Dale Robertson, and The Rough Riders with Kent Taylor and Jan Merlin. He even took a shift as Pete the fireman at the auxiliary fire station on Leave It to Beaver before Burt Mustin's Gus permanently replaced him.

Wright was cast in the 1958 episode "The Cave-In" episode of the syndicated series Rescue 8, starring Jim Davis and Canadian-born Lang Jeffries. He played an elderly man who attempts with shovel and bucket to build a backyard swimming pool for his grandchildren with disastrous results because of the lack of proper shoring.

In 1959, he was cast as J.C. Sickel in the episode, "Payment in Full" of the NBC western series, Riverboat, starring Darren McGavin. Also appearing in this episode were Aldo Ray as Hunk Farber, John Larch as Touhy, and Barbara Bel Geddes as Missy. In the story line, Farber betrays his friend and employer to collect reward money, which he uses to court his girlfriend, Missy.

From 1959 to 1961, Wright had recurring roles on NBC's Bat Masterson and CBS's Dennis the Menace. He also made multiple appearances on I Love Lucy, The Adventures of Ozzie and Harriet, The Lone Ranger, Sugarfoot, December Bride, and Maverick.

Wright made three guest appearances on Perry Mason between 1959 and 1961. He first appeared as Chuck Clark in "The Case of the Petulant Partner", then as Adam Thompson in "The Case of the Nimble Nephew", and finally as James Vardon in "The Case of the Brazen Bequest". In 1960, Wright appeared as Mr. Johnson on CBS's The Danny Thomas Show in the episode titled "Danny Meets Andy Griffith", the spin-off for The Andy Griffith Show. On The Andy Griffith Show, Wright portrayed department store owner and landlord Ben Weaver in three episodes from 1960 to 1962. After his death, he was replaced as Ben Weaver, first by Tol Avery, and then by Jason Johnson. Wright made his last onscreen appearances in a 1962 episode of NBC's Bonanza.

== Death ==
On June 19, 1962, aged 68, Wright died of cancer at Cedars of Lebanon Hospital in Los Angeles.

== Filmography ==
Year	Title	Role	Notes
1934	Pure Feud	Lem	Short, Uncredited, first role
1940	Blondie Plays Cupid	Tucker	
1941	Maisie Was a Lady	Judge Thatcher	Uncredited
1941	Blossoms in the Dust	Texas Senator	Uncredited
1941	Cracked Nuts	Sylvanus Boogle	
1941	Richest Man in Town	Frederick Johnson	
1941	Honky Tonk	Townsman at Meeting House	Uncredited
1941	Mob Town	Pawnbroker	Uncredited
1941	Nothing but the Truth	Mr. Bart Prichard	Uncredited
1941	Shadow of the Thin Man	Maguire - Nervous Ticket Seller	Uncredited
1941	The Tell-Tale Heart	Second Deputy Sheriff	Short, Uncredited
1942	Shut My Big Mouth	Long	
1942	Saboteur	J.C. Lormans - Company Official	Uncredited
1942	The Postman Didn't Ring	Mr. Slade	
1942	Tales of Manhattan	Old Concertgoer	(Laughton sequence), Uncredited
1942	Bambi	Friend Owl	Voice, Uncredited
1942	Wildcat	John 'Paw' Smithers	
1942	The Major and the Minor	Ticket Agent #1	Uncredited
1942	USS VD: Ship of Shame	Commandant	Uncredited
1942	Tennessee Johnson	Alderman	Uncredited
1942	A Man's World	Dan O'Driscoll	
1943	The Meanest Man in the World	Pawn Shop Owner	Uncredited
1943	Submarine Alert	Local Sheriff	Uncredited
1943	Cowboy in Manhattan	Higgins	Uncredited
1943	The Good Fellows	Brother from Danville	Uncredited
1943	Sleepy Lagoon	Cyrus Coates	
1943	So Proudly We Hail!	Col. Clark	Uncredited
1943	Minesweeper	Naval Captain	Uncredited
1943	Here Comes Elmer	Horace Parrot	
1943	In Old Oklahoma	Doctor	Uncredited
1944	The Navy Way	Baldy - Triangle A Ranch Hand	Uncredited
1944	You Can't Ration Love	Judge Cary, Justice of the Peace	Uncredited
1944	Take It Big	Rodeo Judge	Uncredited
1944	Wilson	Hughes Campaign Orator in Maine	Uncredited
1944	The Town Went Wild	Judge Harry Schrank	Uncredited
1944	Dangerous Passage	Postal Clerk	Uncredited
1944	Practically Yours	Sen. Cowling	Uncredited
1945	Grissly's Millions	John Frey	
1945	High Powered	Jeff Hines	Uncredited
1945	Salome Where She Danced	Sheriff	
1945	Rhapsody in Blue	Rachmaninoff	
1945	Bewitched	Mr. Herkheimer	
1945	You Came Along	Col. Dale V. Armstrong	Uncredited
1945	The Strange Affair of Uncle Harry	Mr. Nelson	Uncredited
1945	State Fair	Hog Judge	Uncredited
1945	The Loose Nut	Bull Dozer	Voice, Uncredited
1945	Scarlet Street	Globe Loan Office Manager	Uncredited
1946	The Madonna's Secret	The Riverman	
1946	Road to Utopia	Mr. Latimer	Uncredited
1946	The Hoodlum Saint	Allan Smith - Times Editor	Uncredited
1946	Johnny Comes Flying Home	Foreman	Uncredited
1946	Apple Andy	The Devil	Voice, Uncredited
1946	The Blue Dahlia	'Dad' Newell	
1946	They Made Me a Killer	Henry, the Blacksmith	Uncredited
1946	Without Reservations	Pullman Conductor	Uncredited
1946	One Exciting Week	Otis Piper	
1946	Who's Cookin' Who?	Wolfie Wolf	Voice, Uncredited
1946	Hot Cargo	Tim Chapman	
1946	Rendezvous with Annie	Elmer Snodgrass	
1946	The Inner Circle	Henry Boggs	
1946	Down Missouri Way	Prof. Morris	
1946	The Reckless Driver	Wally Walrus	Voice, Uncredited
1946	Big Town	Station Agent	Uncredited
1946	The Jolson Story	Sourpuss Movie Patron	Uncredited
1946	Blue Skies	Dan - Stage Manager	Uncredited
1946	Fair Weather Fiends	Wolfie Wolf	Voice, Uncredited
1947	California	Chairman	Uncredited
1947	Danger Street	Bullward - Police Chief	Uncredited
1947	Blaze of Noon	Mr. Thomas	
1947	The Long Night	Mr. Tully - the Janitor	Uncredited
1947	The Trouble with Women	Commissioner	Uncredited
1947	Keeper of the Bees	Dr. Grayson	
1947	Mother Wore Tights	Withers	
1947	Cynthia	Gus Wood	
1947	Along the Oregon Trail	Jim Bridger	
1947	Wild Harvest	Mike Alperson	
1948	Relentless	Sam - the Horse Dealer	
1948	The Inside Story	J.J. Johnson	
1948	Mr. Blandings Builds His Dream House	Eph Hackett	Uncredited
1948	Green Grass of Wyoming	Jake Willis	
1948	So This Is New York	Uncle Fergus	Uncredited
1948	The Walls of Jericho	Dr. Patterson	Uncredited
1948	They Live by Night	Mobley	
1948	Black Eagle	Sheriff Clancy	
1948	Disaster	Pop Hansford	
1948	An Act of Murder	Judge Jim Wilder	
1948	Whispering Smith	Sheriff McSwiggin	
1949	Act of Violence	Pop	
1949	Little Women	Mr. Grace, Store Proprietor	Uncredited
1949	The Green Promise	Mr. Grinstedt	Uncredited
1949	Big Jack	Will Farnsworth	
1949	Grape Nutty	Crow	Voice, Uncredited
1949	Lust for Gold	Parsons	Uncredited
1949	Brimstone	Martin Tredwell	
1949	Miss Grant Takes Richmond	Roscoe Johnson	Uncredited
1949	All the King's Men	Dolph Pillsbury	
1949	Adam's Rib	Judge Marcasson	
1949	Mrs. Mike	Dr. McIntosh	
1950	House by the River	Inspector Sarten	
1950	A Ticket to Tomahawk	Marshal Kit Dodge	
1950	The Savage Horde	Judge Thomas Cole	
1950	No Way Out	Dr. Cheney	Uncredited
1950	Sunset in the West	Sheriff Tad Osborne	
1950	Walk Softly, Stranger	Jake, Poker Player	Uncredited
1950	Dallas	Judge Harper	Uncredited
1951	Vengeance Valley	Mr. Willoughby	
1951	My Forbidden Past	Luther Toplady	Alternative title: Carriage Entrance
1951	Excuse My Dust	Race judge	
1951	Never Trust a Gambler	Cap Douglas	Uncredited
1951	The Tall Target	Thomas I. Ogden - Train Passenger	Uncredited
1951	People Will Talk	Uncle John Higgins	Uncredited
1952	The Las Vegas Story	Mike Fogarty	
1952	Young Man with Ideas	Party Guest	Uncredited
1952	Paula	Raymond Bascom	
1952	Lydia Bailey	Consul	Uncredited
1952	Lure of the Wilderness	Sheriff Brink	He appeared in I love Lucy to episodes in the 50s.
1952	Holiday for Sinners	The Man with a Cigar	
1952	O. Henry's Full House	Manager	(segment "The Clarion Call"), Uncredited
1952	The Happy Time	Family Doctor	
1953	Niagara	Boatman	
1953	The Last Posse	Todd Mitchell	
1953	The Wild One	Art Kleiner	
1954	River of No Return	Trader	Uncredited
1954	Johnny Guitar	Ned - Bank Teller	Uncredited
1954	The Raid	Josiah Anderson	
1954	Willy		Episode: "Operation Stocks"
1955	Lux Video Theatre	Commodore	Episode: "The Amazing Mrs. Halliday"
1955	The Lone Ranger	Uncle Ed Andrews	Episode: "Uncle Ed"
1955	Not as a Stranger	Mr. Roberts	Uncredited
1955	The Kentuckian	John Decker - Shopkeeper	Uncredited
1955	The Tall Men	Gus - Bartender	Uncredited
1955	The Man with the Golden Arm	Harry Lane	Uncredited
1955	The Court-Martial of Billy Mitchell	Admiral William S. Sims	
1955	The Bob Cummings Show	Burt Mason	Episode "Bob Becomes a Genius"
1955, 1958	Fury	Windy	Episode" Ghost Town"; Episode: "The Meanest Man"
1955, 1960	The Danny Thomas Show	Will Finch; Mr. Johnson	Episode: "A Trip To Wisconsin; Episode: "Danny Meets Andy Griffith"
1956	The Lone Ranger	Marshal Griff Allison	Episode: "No Handicap"
1956	Lassie	Caleb Brown	Episode: "The Trial"
1956	These Wilder Years	Old Cab Driver	
1957	Mr. Adams and Eve	Calhern	Episode: "They're Off and Running"
1957	The Iron Sheriff	Judge	
1957	The Wayward Bus	Van Brunt	
1957	Johnny Tremain	Ephraim Lapham	
1957	Jeanne Eagels	Marshal	Uncredited
1957	Casey Jones	Ed Corley	Episode: "Night Run"
1957	Maverick	Jabe Hallock	Episode: "Rope of Cards"
1958	The Restless Gun	Jim Blackwell	Episode: "Woman from Sacramento"
1958	The Restless Gun	Hiram Grover	Episode: "Hiram Grover's Strike"
1958	Trackdown	Luke Wilson	Episode: "The Toll Road"
1958	The Missouri Traveler	Sheriff Peavy	
1958	Leave It to Beaver	Pete at Firehouse #7	Episode: "Child Care"
1958	Quantrill's Raiders	Judge	
1958	Gunman's Walk	Judge	
1958	Rock-A-Bye Baby	Fire Chief	Uncredited
1959	Rawhide	Grandpa	S2:E2, "Incident of Roman Candles"
1959	Alias Jesse James	Titus Queasley	
1959	The 30 Foot Bride of Candy Rock	Pentagon General	
1959	Perry Mason	Chuck Clark	Episode: "The Petulant Partner"
1959–1961	Dennis the Menace	Mister Merrivale	
1960	Mr. Lucky	The Leadville Kid	Episode: "The Leadville Kid Gang"
1960	The Adventures of Ozzie and Harriet	Mr. Stewart	Episode: "A Piano for the Fraternity"
1960	Inherit the Wind	Bible Salesman	Uncredited
1960	The Deputy	Delaney	Episode: "The Chain of Action"
1960	Perry Mason	Adam Thompson	Episode: "The Case of the Nimble Nephew"
1960–1962	Bonanza	Micah Bailey; Will Reagan; Seth Coombs	Episode: "Desert Justice"; Episode: "The Fugitive"; Episode: "The Mountain Girl", (final appearance)
1960–1962	The Andy Griffith Show	Ben Weaver	Episode: "Christmas Story"; Episode: "Andy Forecloses"; Episode: "The Merchant of Mayberry"
1961	Rawhide	Grandfather	S4:E7, "The Black Sheep"
1961	Perry Mason	James Vardon	Episode: "The Case of the Brazen Bequest "
1961	The Donna Reed Show	Oliver	Episode: "Aunt Belle's Earrings"
1961	Mr. Ed	Mister Thompson	Episode: "Pine Lake Lodge"
1961	77 Sunset Strip	Luther Hanks	Episode: "Mr. Goldilocks"
1961	The Tall Man	Mayor Hackett	Episode: "Death or Taxes"
1961	The Deadly Companions	Doctor Acton	
1961	Twenty Plus Two	Newspaper Morgue Attendant	Uncredited
1961	The Dick Van Dyke Show	Mr. Petrie Sr, Rob's Father	Episode "Empress Carlotta" (S1E12)
1961	Bat Masterson	Billy Willow, an old timer cowboy	Episode: "Bullwhacker’s Bounty" (S3E19)
1962	Cape Fear	Dr. Pearsall	Final Film Role
