= Bride and Groom (radio program) =

1945-1950 old-time radio human-interest program

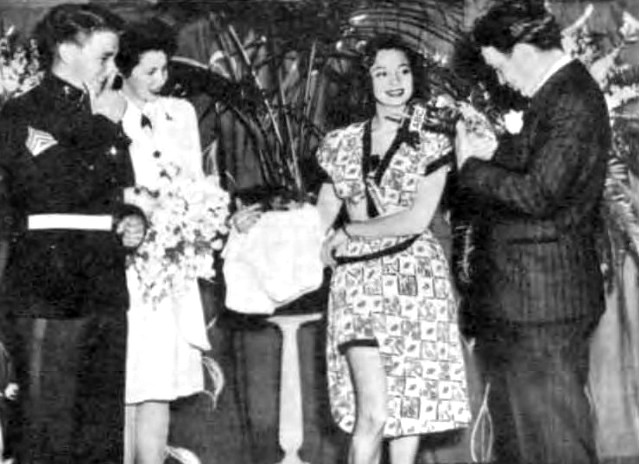
- A newlywed couple on the radio program Bride and Groom receives wedding gifts from the program's host, John Nelson (right).
- Genre: Human-interest
- Running time: 30 minutes
- Country of origin: United States
- Language: English
- Syndicates: ABC
- TV adaptations: Bride and Groom (TV series)
- Starring: John Nelson
- Announcer: Jack McElroy
- Created by: John Masterson
- Written by: John Reddy
- Directed by: Edward Feldman; John Masterson
- Executive producer: John Masterson
- Original release: November 26, 1945 – September 15, 1950
- Sponsored by: Sterling Drug

Bride and Groom is an old-time radio human-interest program in the United States. It was broadcast on ABC from November 26, 1945, to September 15, 1950. Each episode featured an engaged couple who would be married during the broadcast, then showered with gifts.

In 1951, it was adapted as a television show of the same name.

== Format ==
Each episode centred on a couple engaged to be married. An episode would begin with host John Nelson interviewing the couple, with questions about how the two met and their courtship. Announcer Jack McElroy would sing a song for the couple, who would then exit to an adjacent chapel to be married by one of around 30 clergymen retained by the show. During the wedding ceremony, which was not recorded, Nelson would chat with members of the audience. He would usually speak with married couples who were celebrating significant anniversary milestones, who would be given gifts such as matching wristwatches. After the ceremony, the newlyweds returned to the studio where they received wedding gifts provided by sponsors, such as refrigerators, stoves, silverware and jewelry, as a reward for participating in the program.

The 30-minute program was sponsored by Sterling Drug until January 2, 1950.

== Casting ==
Radio historian John Dunning wrote, "During its five-year run, Bride and Groom told the stories of almost 1,000 new couples." Couples who were ready to marry provided information about themselves to the show's staff. Applications were reviewed by director John Reddy or a panel of judges.

As a matter of policy, the show excluded divorcees from consideration. Roman Catholic couples were also not cast because their faith would have required them to be married in a Catholic church. Couples married on the show ranged in age from teenagers to octogenarians. On occasion, the show featured celebrity couples, such as radio personality Bud Collyer and actress Marian Shockley in 1948. Also in 1948, but before he became famous, actor Dick Van Dyke married his first wife, Marjorie Willett.

== Personnel ==
John Nelson was the program's host, while Jack McElroy was the announcer. Music was by Gaylord Carter. Edward Feldman and John Masterson were the directors, and John Reddy was the writer.

== See also ==
- Bride and Groom (TV series)
