= The Jayhawkers! =

1959 film by Melvin Frank

- Original theatrical poster
- Directed by: Melvin Frank
- Written by: A. I. Bezzerides; Frank Fenton; Melvin Frank
- Based on: story by Frank Fenton; Joe Petracca
- Produced by: Melvin Frank; Norman Panama
- Starring: Jeff Chandler; Fess Parker
- Cinematography: Loyal Griggs
- Edited by: Everett Douglas
- Music by: Jerome Moross
- Production company: Parwood Productions
- Distributed by: Paramount Pictures
- Release date: 15 October 1959
- Running time: 100 minutes
- Country: United States
- Language: English
- Box office: $1 million (est. US/ Canada rentals)

The Jayhawkers! is a 1959 American Technicolor VistaVision western film directed by Melvin Frank, starring Jeff Chandler as Luke Darcy and Fess Parker as Cam Bleeker. The film is set in pre-Civil War land of the Kansas Territory. Darcy leads a gang which seeks to take advantage of Bleeding Kansas (loosely based on abolitionist John Brown); Bleeker joins the gang. The supporting cast features Henry Silva and Leo Gordon.

== Plot summary ==
In the years leading up to the Civil War, violent conflict erupts in the Kansas Territory over whether it will enter the Union as a free or slave state. Cam Bleeker, a farmer imprisoned for leading a gang of raiders, breaks out and returns to his home to find Jeanne Dubois, a stranger, living there with her two young children.

Outside the house are the graves of Bleeker's wife, who died under mysterious circumstances, and Dubois' late husband. Bleeker claims he escaped from prison after learning his wife was involved with another man. Dubois explains that Mrs. Bleeker's grave was already there when her family bought the property six months earlier, and that her husband was shot dead by Missouri Redleg raiders shortly after their arrival. Government soldiers arrest Bleeker when the sheriff learns he is there. Governor William Clayton promises not to hang Bleeker if he can capture Luke Darcy, a dangerous, frontier dictator whose raiders threaten to take over the whole territory. Clayton reveals it was Darcy, a serial seducer of women, who killed Bleeker's wife.

Bleeker's search takes him to a group of Darcy gang members hanging a group of men. Bleeker snatched one of the condemned men and forces him to take him to Darcy in a newly captured town. Bleeker introduces himself to Darcy in his headquarters, a saloon, and demonstrates his talents as a fighter convincingly enough to be granted membership in Darcy's gang. As they become acquainted, Darcy describes his goal of taking over Kansas one town at a time. When he admits to using and discarding Bleeker's wife, by raiding town after town. He also admits to using and discarding Bleeker's wife.

During a raid near the Dubois farm, horsemen unintentionally run down Dubois' daughter. Bleeker, wearing his gang garb, takes the injured girl home. Dubois chastises Bleeker for helping Darcy and putting innocent lives at risk. They take the girl to the doctor, and Bleeker talks to the governor, describing his plan to catch Darcy using a train load of gold in Abilene as bait. Bleeker convinces Darcy enough gold to buy a stockpile of weapons awaits, enough to ensure victory in hiw war. The gang takes over Abilene and waits for the train to arrive. Darcy tells Bleeker and Dubois, at Bleeker's side, that they should leave and build a life for themselves somewhere else, telling them "Don't worry about me. I got what I want. I got Kansas."

Before the federal troops in the train reveal themselves and arrest the gang members, Bleeker resolves to confront Darcy and settle his personal score with him, despite the governor's order to take him alive. Lordan, a gang member who knows about the federal plan, warns Darcy before Bleeker can arrive. Bleeker finds the saloon full of gang members, and Darcy orders them to vacate the town before the trap is sprung.

Darcy and Bleeker square off and Bleeker wins the ensuing fistfight. He takes Darcy at gunpoint to face the gallows, and when Darcy talks about the imminent "carnival" of a hanging, Bleeker challenges Darcy to a gun duel. Bleeker kills Darcy, though it appears Darcy intentionally missed with his shot. Bleeker surrenders to the governor, having broken his agreement by shooting Darcy. The governor tells him, "Bleeker, you don't know why you couldn't let him hang, and I don't know why I'm letting you go free. But I've got a feeling we're both right."

== Cast ==
- Jeff Chandler as Luke Darcy
- Fess Parker as Cam Bleeker
- Nicole Maurey as Jeanne Dubois
- Henry Silva as Lordan
- Herbert Rudley as Governor William Clayton
- Jimmy Carter as Paul
- Shari Lee Bernath as Martha
- Leo Gordon as Jake Barton
- Barbara Knudson as Mrs. Maxton
- Rudy Sooter as Jayhawker

== Production ==
The film was made by the team of Norman Panama and Melvin Frank who had a deal with Paramount. They bought the story in January 1957. Panama and Frank were best known for their comedies and had made a comic Western, Callaway Went Thataway but The Jayhawkers was serious. Frank said at the time:

The world has changed in eight years. This is no time to satirize western myth; people won't stand for the making fun of something sacred. Actually, why The Jayhawkers is in the outdoor category and has outlaws and guns and horses, it's a western only in that it takes place on the then-frontier of 1859. Something frightening happened in Kansas on the eve of the Civil War... A man on horseback tried to become A Man on Horseback. He took over only a few towns- but what would've happened if he'd seized Kansas for his empire and the Civil War had allowed him to set up a kingdom in the West? The power mad character has always threatened freedom. We had long wanted to use this theme in a story about the American past and when we found this story... it clicked.

Panama and Frank subjected the script to analysis by a psychological consulting firm.

Melvin Frank tried to interest Vivien Leigh in the female lead. Chandler made the film on loan out from Universal International. Filming started 1 December 1958.
