= The Al Pearce Show =

- Genre: Variety
- Written by: Jack Harvey; Howard Blake; Carl Gass
- Directed by: Bill Sterling
- Starring: Al Pearce
- Theme music composer: Harry Sosnik
- Country of origin: United States
- No. of seasons: 1

Production
- Producer: Stefan Hatos
- Running time: 45 minutes (February 11, 1952 - April 1, 1952); 30 minutes (April 4, 1952 - May 9, 1952) varied (June 30, 1952 - September 26, 1952)

Original release
- Network: CBS
- Release: February 11 – September 26, 1952

The Al Pearce Show
- Genre: Variety
- Starring: Al Pearce
- Theme music composer: Harry Sosnik
- Country of origin: United States
- No. of seasons: 1

Production
- Running time: 30 minutes

Original release
- Network: CBS
- Release: July 3 – September 4, 1952

The Al Pearce Show is the name of two comedy-variety television series airing on CBS during 1952. Both series starred comedian and radio personality Al Pearce.

== Daytime ==
The morning version of the show, originating in Hollywood, was a collection of music, songs and topical discussions directed at housewives. It was 45 minutes in length and ran from February 11, 1952, to May 9, 1952. After a brief hiatus, it returned as a 30-minute program on June 30, 1952, and lasted until September 26.

It had the following broadcast history:

Starting Date	Ending Date	Time	Network
February 11, 1952	April 1, 1952	10:45-11 a.m.	CBS
April 4, 1952	May 9, 1952	11-11:30 a.m.	CBS
June 30, 1952	September 26, 1952	10:45-11 a.m. (Monday-Thursday); 10:30-11 a.m. (Friday)	CBS

The program was the earliest network TV program broadcast live in Hollywood (7:45-8:30 a.m. Pacific Time). It was carried on CBS-owned KNXT, which played music from the end of the Pearce program until regular programming began at 11:30 a.m.

== Nighttime ==
The evening version of the show alternated with the George Burns and Gracie Allen Show on Thursday nights at 8:00 pm from July 10, 1952, until September 18, 1952, at which point the ‘’Burns and Allen Show’’ became weekly. Judd Whiting was the director for the program, which originated from WCBS in New York City.

However, the Total Television reference book by Alex McNeil says "his prime-time half-hour show ... replaced The Burns and Allen Show for the summer," giving a starting date of July 3, 1952, and an ending date of September 4, 1952.

=== Guests ===
Evening show guests included characters from Pearce’s successful radio programs: Arlene Harris (the “Human Chatterbox”), Bill Comstock (as “health expert” Tizzie Lish), Yogi Yorgesson, and singer Art Morton.

== Reception ==
While television executives, always on the look out for talent, were enthusiastic about the shows, neither the audience nor the network affiliates shared their enthusiasm. And Pearce, who had come out of retirement to appear, hated the hours. Both shows were cancelled within eight months.
