= Al Pearce =

American singer (1898–1961)

- Born: Albert Pearce; July 25, 1898; San Jose, California, U.S.
- Died: June 2, 1961 (aged 62); Newport Beach, California, U.S.
- Occupation: Comedian
- Years active: 1928–1947

Albert Pearce (July 25, 1898 – June 2, 1961) was an American comedian, singer and banjo player who was a popular personality on several radio networks from 1928 to 1947.

== Biography ==
After selling insurance door-to-door during the 1920s, Pearce began selling real estate. With his brother Cal, he sang on the air in 1928 as part of the San Francisco Real Estate Glee Club. He moved from music to comedy on KFRC, San Francisco, after the writer Jack Hasty gave him a comedy sketch about a nervous door-to-door salesman named Elmer Blurt. As Pearce rose to fame, Blurt's running gag, "Nobody home, I hope, I hope, I hope", became a national catch phrase.

=== Radio ===
When Pearce's The Happy Go Lucky Hour (sometimes titled Al Pearce and His Gang) began on KFRC in 1928, his gang consisted of his brother Cal, Abe Bloom, Charles Carter, Jean Clarimoux, Edna Fisher, Harry K. McClintock, Tommy Harris, Norman Nielsen, Monroe Upton (as Lord Bilgewater), Hazel Warner and Cecil Wright. The musical-variety show was such a success in San Francisco from 1928 until 1932 that it moved to the Blue Network on January 13, 1934, airing on Saturdays at 6 pm until September when the 30-minute series split into two 15-minute shows heard on Mondays and Fridays at 5 pm. It continued in those time slots until March 29, 1935.

Pearce had a sponsor with Pepsodent Toothpaste for Friday afternoon shows on both the Blue Network and NBC from May 13, 1935, until April 3, 1936. His mid-1930s gang included the comic Morey Amsterdam, "human chatterbox" Arlene Harris, vocalist Mabel Todd, singing comic Andy Andrews (who later achieved regional fame as "Ranger Andy", the host of a popular Hartford children's program) and nutty cooking and health expert "Tizzie Lish", portrayed by Bill Comstock.

On January 5, 1937, Pearce moved to CBS for the Ford Motor-sponsored series, Watch the Fun Go By, airing on Tuesdays at 9 pm until June 28, 1938. In 1937, Arthur "Artie" Auerbach joined the show as the Yiddish-accented "Mr. Kitzel", staying until about 1946, when he took the character to Jack Benny's show. Auerbach's catchphrase as Mr. Kitzel was "It's a possibility!".

Sponsored by Grape Nuts, Pearce returned to NBC on Mondays at 8 pm from October 10, 1938, to July 31, 1939.

Back at CBS, under the sponsorship of Dole Pineapple, he broadcast on Wednesdays at 8 pm from October 11, 1939, until April 3, 1940.

Camel Cigarettes was his sponsor for his CBS series on Fridays at 7:30 pm from May 3, 1940, until January 2, 1942.

In 1944, his sponsor was Dr. Pepper (which still had the dot in the name then), and when he was replaced on the Blue Network by an audience participation show, Darts for Dough, Pearce continued elsewhere while Dr. Pepper stayed on as the sponsor of Darts for Dough.

Pearce was also a frequent guest on the popular Armed Air Force Radio Service during World War II on shows such as Mail Call and Command Performance.

=== Film ===
Pearce starred as himself in The Hit Parade (1937) and Here Comes Elmer (1943) both for Republic Pictures, which featured his Elmer Blurt character. He also appeared in other films for Republic including Hitchhike to Happiness (1945), One Exciting Week (1946) and The Main Street Kid (1948).

=== Television ===
In 1952, Pearce had two television programs, a daily daytime show and a weekly nighttime show. Both were called The Al Pearce Show.

== Accolades ==
For his work in radio, Pearce received a star on the Hollywood Walk of Fame. Located at 6328 Hollywood Boulevard, it was dedicated on February 8, 1960.
