= Bil Baird =

American puppeteer (1904–1987)

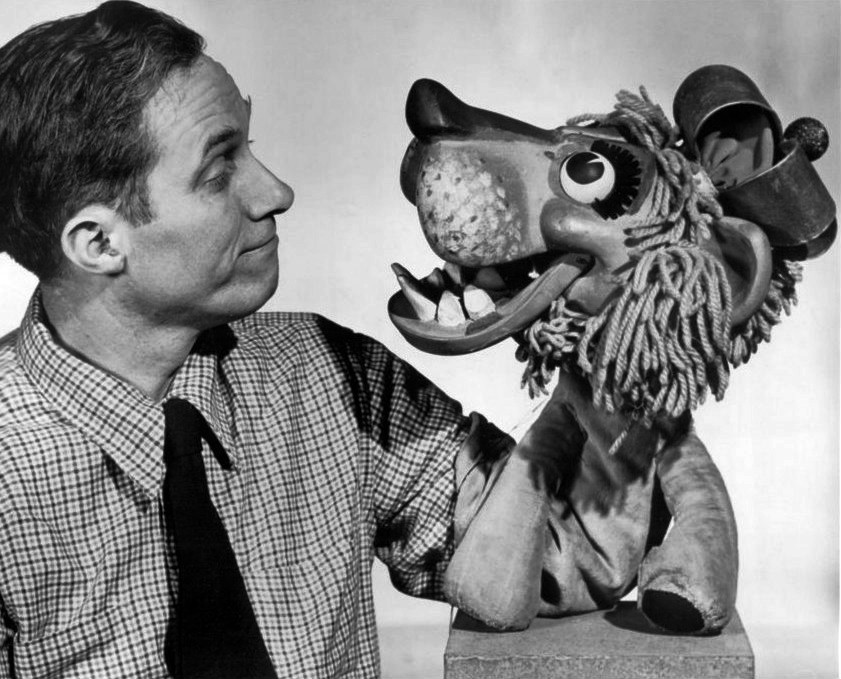
- Baird and Charlemane, 1963
- Born: August 15, 1904; Grand Island, Nebraska, U.S.
- Died: March 18, 1987 (aged 82); New York City, U.S.
- Education: University of Iowa
- Occupation: Puppeteer
- Years active: 1928–1987
- Spouses: Evelyn Schwartz (m. 1932; div. 1936); Cora Baird (née Eisenberg) (m. 1937; died 1967); Josie Lloyd (m. 1974)
- Children: 2, including Peter Baird
- Relatives: George Baird, '28 Olympian

William Britton "Bil" Baird (August 15, 1904 – March 18, 1987) was an American puppeteer of the mid- and late 20th century. He and his puppets performed for millions of adults and children. One of his better known creations was Charlemane the lion. He and his wife Cora Eisenberg Baird (1912–1967) produced and performed the famous puppetry sequence for "The Lonely Goatherd" in the film version of The Sound of Music. His son Peter Baird was also a puppeteer, and he continued his family's legacy until his own death in July 2004.

He wrote The Art of the Puppet (1965) and provided the puppets for Dark Shadows. Baird also created the expandable nose Peter Noone wore as Pinocchio in the 1968 musical adaptation of the Carlo Collodi story that aired on NBC as a Hallmark Hall of Fame special.

== Early life and family ==
"Bil" William Baird was born on August 14, 1904 in Grand Island, Nebraska, the older of two male siblings to William Hull Baird and Louise Hetzel Baird. Bil's father William was a Chemist who oversaw sugarbeet manufacturing facilities. Frequent moves occurred during Bil's early life, as his father was required to help open manufacturing facilities around America. Like Bil, his younger brother George attended the University of Iowa. George ran track for Iowa from 1925–1929, set an American record in the Quarter mile, and won a gold Olympic medal in the 1928 Amsterdam Olympics in the 4x400 meter relay. In the 1930's brother George would work with Bil's company the Baird Marionettes.

After several moves in his youth, when Bill was 16, the Baird family moved to Mason City around 1920, where he was a graduate of Mason City High School. He traced his love of puppets to the moment when his father William made him a simple string puppet when he was eight. At an early age, he began performing as a puppeteer for neighborhood children. At the age of 17, in 1921, Bil attended a local performance of the Tony Sarg production of Rip Van Winkle, which cemented his interest. By the time he was 14, Baird was creating his own puppets and giving performances in the attic of his parents' home. In 1928, he helped Tony Sarg create the giant balloons for Macy's Thanksgiving Day parade.

== Performance career ==
A graduate of the University of Iowa where he performed his shows, and the Chicago Academy of Fine Arts, he began work with childhood idol Tony Sarg in New York City in 1928. Several years later Baird formed his own company, the Baird Marionettes, which performed initially at the Chicago World’s Fair of 1933. Baird was a talented artist and a musician, who played accordion, guitar, banjo, and piano. He often wrote the scores for his performances, drew and created the clothing for his puppets, and designed the sets.

In 1950, Baird and Producer Yul Brynner created a show based on his character Snarky Parker called Life With Snarky Parker, which was a satire of American Westerns. The show featured numerous characters who were previously created by Baird, including "Snarky Parker", the lion "Charlemane", "Flannel Mouse", "Slugger Ryan", a piano-playing rod puppet, along with new characters "Fluffy" and "Nolan", the Villain "Ronald Rodent", the slightly befuddled "Birdie", the seductive "Cuda Bara", the schoolteacher and Snarky's love interest "Butterbelle", and her father "Paw". In 1951, 40 of Baird's Marionettes (operated by the Bairds and two assistants) performed some of the roles in the Broadway musical Flahooley, a fantasy about a mass-produced laughing doll who unintentionally threatens the American industrial system. From November 3, 1951, to September 20, 1952, the Bairds had The Whistling Wizard puppet show on Saturday mornings on CBS television.

=== Late 1950s–1960s ===
Baird's puppets often appeared in educational shows. In 1956, Baird's puppets "Gargle" and "Snarky" were in Adventures in Numbers and Space, a nine-part series by Westinghouse Broadcasting designed to interest children in mathematics.

In 1957, Bil and Cora Baird created and performed the Charles Dickens, Edgar Alan Poe, and Feedor Doestoevski puppets in The Strange Case of the Cosmic Rays, directed by Frank Capra and William T. Hurtz. The show, produced by Bell Laboratories as part of The Bell System Science Series was nominated for an Emmy for Best Public Service Program or Series.

From 1958 to 1963, Baird Puppets appeared on an educational program Parlons Français (Let's Talk French), which taught young children how to speak French. For this show, Baird created three new hand puppets named "Patapouf", "Lady Graybangs" and "Cliquot", who provided lessons to children while accompanied by Anne Slack, the hostess of the program.

The text of Bil and Cora Baird's play The Magic Onion was published in Woman's Day in 1961. It is performed still, and features "a beautiful princess and her faithful dog, a wicked magician and his magic onion, a handsome prince, a hungry dragon, and a castle in an enchanted blue forest."

In 1959, Baird helped create Schultz & Dooley, who appeared in advertisements for Utica Club Beer from 1959–1964.

In the September 29th, 1967 episode of the ABC-TV gothic, soap opera Dark Shadows Baird's name appears in the closing credits for the bat that attacks David Collins.

They toured Russia, India, Nepal, Afghanistan, and Turkey, appeared in "The Lonely Goatherd" sequence in the film The Sound of Music (1965), as well as in the ABC-TV 1958 television special Art Carney Meets Peter and the Wolf and Art Carney Meets the Sorcerer's Apprentice, graced many World's Fairs, created commercials for Remington Razors, Wildroot Cream-Oil, Wheaties cereal, Borden Dairy, Bonomo Taffy, United Cerebral Palsy, and Young & Rubicam and were part of five Macy's Thanksgiving Day Parades. During the 1964/65 World's Fair in New York City, Baird's Marionettes hosted "The Show-Go-Round", an elaborate musical exhibit in the Chrysler Pavilion.

Opening in 1967, the Bil Baird Marionette Theater at 59 Barrow Street in Greenwich Village presented plays for more than a decade. Among them, Ali Baba, The Wizard of Oz, Pinocchio, Alice in Wonderland, Winnie-the-Pooh, Peter and the Wolf, Davy Jones' Locker, A Pageant of Puppet Variety, Holiday on Strings, People is the Thing That the World is Fullest Of, Bil Baird's Band-Wagon, The Dragon and The Dentist, L'Histoire du Soldat, and The Whistling Wizard and the Sultan of Tuffet.

=== 1970s–1980s ===
In 1972, Baird created an educational short film called Cartonella which told about the importance of milk, the short was a typical 'Damsel in Distress' story which featured the eponymously named "Cartonella", who was a fortune telling cow. This character would later become one of Baird's most popular characters, even having her own float during the 1974/75 Macy's Thanksgiving Day Parades.

In 1974, Baird married actress Josie Lloyd, 36 years his junior, and they remained together until his death in 1987.

In 1977, Baird temporarily closed down the theater so he could create another show at Busch Gardens: The Old Country titled Once Upon a Dragon, which replaced the Sid and Marty Krofft show The Camelot Revue and was regularly performed at the Reynold's Aluminum Puppet Theater in the Hastings, England section of the park from 1977 to 1978. That show was notable for starting the careers of several other prominent puppeteers. Those performance artists included Martin P. Robinson, who later portrayed "Telly Monster" and "Mr. Snuffleupagus" on Sesame Street; Randy Carfagno, who later created the costumes of the Racing Presidents for the Major League Baseball Team, The Washington Nationals; Jonathan Freeman, who voiced the villain "Jafar" in Disney's 1992 animated feature film Aladdin; and Craig Marin, who after marrying another Baird puppeteer named Olga Felgemacher, formed the company Flexitoon.

After Once Upon a Dragon ended, Baird continued his puppetry work and helped create several characters for commercials such as the "Flavor Fiend" for Bubble Yum, a family of puppets for an ad for the now-defunct Greenwich Savings Bank, a family of dogs and a Goldilocks character for Hartz Flea Tags, a Maid for Drano, Stop-Motion animated Bottles for Desitin Skin Care Lotion and a puppet version of the mascot of RSO Records. Baird and his puppets would soon appear in another special for HBO called "I've Got The World on a String: The First Annual All-Star Puppet Spectacular", which featured famous singers like Rita Moreno & Ben Vereen.

In 1983, Baird performed a puppet version of Igor Stravinsky's L'Histoire du Soldat, which was his last performance before retiring due to severe arthritis.

In 1985, Baird made a brief return in which he performed one of his own plays called "The Dragon and The Dentist".

== Death ==
On March 18, 1987, Baird died at his home in Manhattan at the age of 82 from pneumonia and cancer. Six months after his death, on September 19–20, Baird's children Laura and Peter sold nearly all of the remaining Bil Baird Marionettes at auction. The 800-lot sale was held in New York City at The Greenwich Auction Room located at 110 East 13th Street. Bonnie Bien invited a class of young students to a puppet show during the exhibition. Peter Baird and others from the Bil Baird Troupe entertained the children. Bonnie as the gallery public relations expert worked all summer until Rita Rieff who wrote the New York Times Auction picked up Bonnie's press release for print. Marionettes depicting Elsie the Cow and her family were sold to a New York collector. A group of Rockette figures and caricature puppets of U.S. presidents Franklin Roosevelt and Harry Truman were purchased by a Pennsylvania toy dealer. Another character, "Olly Oilcan" from the 1939 New York World's Fair, sold for $11,000 (equivalent to $31,000 in 2025). The largest publicly viewable collection of Bil Baird puppets resides at the MacNider Art Museum in Mason City, Iowa.

== Awards and legacy ==
Baird received many awards and honors during his career, including the Medal of Achievement awarded by the Lotos Club of New York and the Distinguished Alumnus Award from the University of Iowa. He was also honored in 1980 by the Union International de la Marionette and Puppeteers of America at the Kennedy Center in Washington, DC.

In December 1988 Bil Baird's Marionettes played at the Minetta Lane Theatre in New York. The play Pinocchio, from the book by Jerome Coopersmith, was produced by Arthur Cantor, and performed by puppeteers Peter B. Baird, Pady Blackwood, Randy Carfagno, Larry Engler, William Tost and Richard Stephen Weber. Mary Rodgers was the composer; Sheldon Harnick wrote the lyrics. (Playbill Vol.88 No.12).
