= Music for Tonight =

Studio album by Steve Allen
- Released: 1955
- Genre: Mood music
- Label: Coral

Music for Tonight is a studio album of "mood music" by television host, Steve Allen. Allen played piano and was backed by an orchestra. It was released in 1955 on Coral Records (catalog no. CRL-57004). It entered Billboard magazine's pop album chart on May 14, 1955, peaked at No. 7, and remained on the chart for 10 weeks. With the album's success, Coral signed a two-year contract with Allen, hoping to develop him as a counterpart to the success of Jackie Gleason's popular "mood music" albums on the Capitol label.

== Track listing ==
Side A

1. "Tonight" (Steve Allen)
2. "Isn't It Romantic?" (Richard Rodgers, Lorenz Hart)
3. "It Can't Be Wrong" (Kim Gannon, Max Steiner)
4. "I'm Glad There Is You (In This World of Ordinary People)" (Jimmy Dorsey, Paul Madeira)
5. "For the Very First Time" (Irving Berlin)
6. "The Man with a Horn" (Bonnie Lake, Eddie Delange, Jack Jenney)

Side B

1. "Candelight" (Steve Allen)
2. "I Fall in Love Too Easily" (Jule Styne, Sammy Cahn)
3. "Imagination" (Johnny Burke, Jimmy Van Heusen)
4. "Long Ago (And Far Away)" (Ira Gershwin, Jerome Kern)
5. "Where Are You?" (Harold Adamson, Jimmy McHugh)
6. "Stay Just a Little While" (Ross Parker, Steve Allen)
