= Richard Harkness =

American journalist

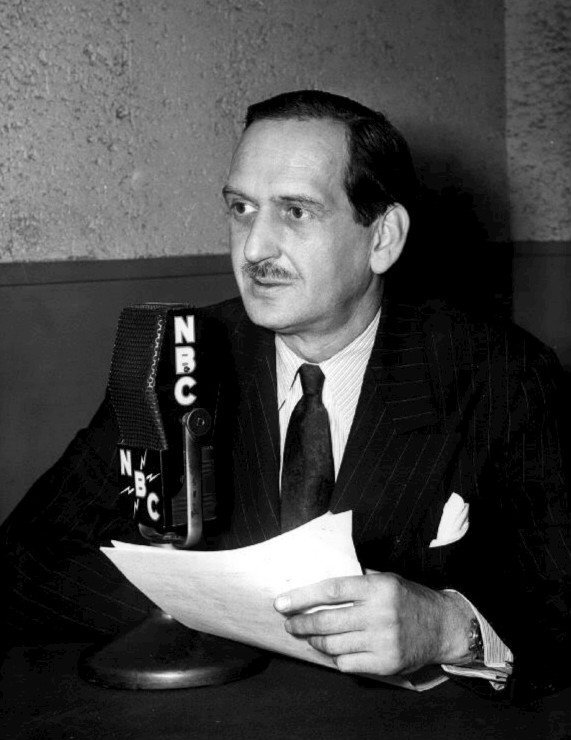
Harkness in 1952.

Richard L. Harkness (1907-February 16, 1977) was an American journalist. He was the Washington correspondent for the National Broadcasting Company from December 1942 to 1970. In the 1940s he had a 15-minute Monday-Friday newscast on NBC radio. Before going into broadcasting, Harkness was the Washington correspondent for The Philadelphia Inquirer. Journalism scholar Edward Bliss Jr. wrote that Harkness "suggested that [President Franklin D.] Roosevelt include freedom from fear in his 'Four Freedoms' speech before Congress in January 1941."

Harkness had the first regularly scheduled NBC television newscast from Washington. He interviewed government officials on the 15-minute weekly program, which began January 7, 1948. Harkness also anchored a Monday-Friday 11:45-noon (Eastern Time) newscast from Washington on NBC.

Harkness headed the national Radio Correspondents Association in 1945. On November 8, 1960, Harkness joined newsmen Chet Huntley and David Brinkley at the anchor desk for the NBC News coverage of the Kennedy-Nixon election night returns. Harkness' role was explaining to viewers the use of computer vote tabulation, relatively new at that time, by the RCA 501 computer. NBC, at that time, was a subsidiary of RCA. In the 1960s, he also did news and commentary on the local newscasts of WRC-TV, NBC's owned-and-operated station in Washington, D. C.

Harkness, retiring from NBC in 1972, later joined President Gerald R. Ford's anti-drug abuse program as press representative.
