= The Straw Hat Matinee =

- Country of origin: United States
- Original language: English

Original release
- Network: NBC
- Release: June 25 – September 7, 1951

The Straw Hat Matinee is an American television series that ran on NBC from June 25 to September 7, 1951.

The series was hosted by Mel Martin and Rosemary Olberding, and was broadcast from Cincinnati. The Ernie Lee Orchestra with June Perkins also appeared on the program.

== Notable people ==
- Rod Serling contributed to the series by writing "'continuity' patter" for the program.

== See also ==
- 1950–51 United States network television schedule (weekday)
