= The Lonely Goatherd =

Song
- Published: 1959
- Songwriter: Oscar Hammerstein II
- Composer: Richard Rodgers

"The Lonely Goatherd" is a popular show tune from the 1959 Rodgers and Hammerstein musical The Sound of Music.

The song is well known for its examples of yodeling, a part of the traditional music of the Austrian Alps, where the musical is set. (Maria von Trapp, however, found the yodeling in the motion picture version of The Sound of Music rendition to be lacking in authenticity.)

== Background ==
This song tells the whimsical story of a goatherd whose yodeling is heard from far off and by passers-by, until he falls in love with a girl who wears a pale-pink coat, with her mother joining in the yodeling. The original 1959 musical has this as the song Maria (played by Mary Martin) sings to comfort the Von Trapp children during a storm.

For the 1965 film adaptation, screenwriter Ernest Lehman repositioned this song to a later part of the film wherein Maria (played by Julie Andrews) and the children sing it as part of a marionette show they perform for their father. The song in place of "The Lonely Goatherd" was "My Favorite Things", which was originally sung earlier in the original musical in the office of the Mother Abbess, as a duet between her and Maria. The duet occurs just prior to Maria's departure to work for Captain von Trapp as governess to his seven children. The puppets appear only once in the film, although the song appears later as Georg and Maria are dancing outside during the party.

While many stage productions retain the original order as used in the 1959 musical, many other productions have also adapted the changes made in the film, shifting "The Lonely Goatherd" to another scene and adding "My Favorite Things" in its place. In the 1981 West End revival with Petula Clark, Maria and the children sing it at a fair, and in the 1998 Broadway revival with Rebecca Luker it is sung at the Salzburg Festival concert, replacing what would have been an intricate Bach-sounding reprise of "Do Re Mi", showing how exemplary the Von Trapp children were at singing difficult choral compositions. Here, the vocal arrangements were by Jeanine Tesori, giving the audience an idea of how versatile they were.

In the 2013 NBC broadcast of The Sound of Music Live!, it was once again used as it was in the original 1959 production.

The lively number reappears later in both the original stage version, the film version and the 2013 NBC special broadcast as a deliberately paced and very Austrian-sounding instrumental, the Ländler, a dance performed by the Captain and Maria. It then serves as the catalyst to a dramatic juncture in the film, as the young novice Maria realizes that she is in love with the Captain.

The famous marionette puppetry sequence in the film was produced and performed by the leading puppeteers of the day, Bil Baird and Cora Baird. The inspiration for the "Lonely Goatherd" scene came from the famous Salzburger Marionettentheater.

According to The Sound of Music Companion, Hammerstein had come up with several phrases to rhyme with the word goatherd, such as "remote heard", "throat heard", "moat heard", etc. to add enjoyment to the song.

== In popular culture ==
Julie Andrews performed this song with The Muppets as the opening number to her guest appearance on The Muppet Show in 1977.

In The Nanny episode "Stock Tip" from Series 2, Brighton accidentally plays the song instead of hip hop and suggests his dad, esteemed Broadway producer Maxwell Sheffield, should play his cassettes on his own stereo to prevent further mix-ups.

In The Story of Tracy Beaker episode "Miss You" from Series 1, Mike is reminiscing about good times with his guitar. We later see him fantasising about taking the Dumping Ground kids camping and in this fantasy we see him singing/playing The Lonely Goatherd, albeit out of tune.

In the Werewolf episode of Mystery Science Theater 3000, Mike Nelson briefly sings the first few lines of the song during the movie's end credits.

In 2006 Gwen Stefani sampled the song in "Wind It Up" on her album The Sweet Escape.

The song was also used briefly in a special Shrek short/Thriller music video featured on the Nintendo 3DS, and was remixed for the credits.

The song is frequently performed by The von Trapps, the real life great-grandchildren of the Captain and Maria, and appears on their Pink Martini collaboration album, Dream a Little Dream, released on March 4, 2014.

Randy Rainbow posted a parody of the song about U.S. presidential candidate Hillary Clinton, titled "The Nasty Woman" on YouTube on October 26, 2016.

Slovenian avant-garde music group Laibach released a cover of "The Lonely Goatherd" as part of their 2018 The Sound of Music album, featuring guest vocals performed by Boris Benko from Silence. The video for The Lonely Goatherd was released on November 19, 2018. It features Milan Fras dressed as a Christian priest guiding a flock of young girls dressed as sheep. Boris Benko appears as the goatherd.
