= Faz Fazakas =

Puppeteer and engineer

- Born: Franz Fazakas; April 5, 1918; Essex County, New Jersey, U.S.
- Died: September 28, 2013 (aged 95); Olivebridge, New York, U.S.
- Occupation: Puppeteer

Franz "Faz" Fazakas (April 5, 1918 – September 28, 2013) was an American puppeteer, engineer, and special effects designer, best known for his work with The Muppets. He is the eponym of Fozzie Bear, for whom he created the puppet's ear-wiggling effects. Fazakas was the director of electronic and mechanical design for the television show Fraggle Rock, most notably creating the control rig for the Doozers.

== Early life ==
Fazakas was born in 1918 to Arpard and Donelda Fazakas. He did not complete high school. He was a private in the Army during World War II. He worked as an organ builder in Orange, New Jersey, before joining Berkeley Marionettes in New York, occasionally performing on Broadway.

For Shirley Temple's TV program The Shirley Temple Show, Fazakas performed the titular character in the show's adaptation of Winnie the Pooh.

He joined up with Jim Henson to work with the Muppets in 1972. He was married to Eleanor Louise Jewett and the couple had two children. He is the great-uncle of musician Tanya Donelly.

== Muppet technology ==
He helped design a radio control system to move the Muppets so they would not all have to be manipulated by hand. This control system was used on movies such as The Dark Crystal and Labyrinth. This system, called the Henson Performance Control System, won the 1991 Scientific and Engineering Academy Award. Versions of this system were what allowed Kermit the Frog to ride a bike and Emmet Otter to row a boat. Jim Henson called Fazakas “one of the true geniuses of the world.” His mechanical work on the eyes and facial movements of longtime Muppets such as Big Bird and Sweetums gave both characters more emotional range.
