= Allen Plays Allen =

Studio album by Steve Allen
- Released: 1956
- Genre: Mood music
- Label: Coral

Allen Plays Allen is an album by television host Steve Allen. Allen played piano on a set of 12 of his own compositions with backing from a small rhythm combo. The album was released in 1956 on Coral Records (catalog no. CRL-57047).

== Track listing ==
Side A

1. "The Girl in the Grey Flannel Suit"
2. "Love Is Young"
3. "Fools"
4. "Magic Star"
5. "I Never Should Have Told You "
6. "With You"

Side B

1. "What Is a Freem?"
2. "That I Don't Love You"
3. "Do You Remember Me?"
4. "All Life Through"
5. "What Is a Woman"
6. "Can I Wait Up for Santa Claus?"

== Reception ==
Upon its release, Billboard wrote that Allen displayed his talent as a pianist with backing by celeste, guitar, bass, and drums, in album that "makes for pleasant listening." AllMusic gave the album a rating of three stars. Reviewer Greg Adams called it "a serious collection of melodies performed fluidly and competently by Allen with few eccentric touches."
