= Miss Susan =

- Susan Peters (left) and Mark Roberts (far right) in a still from Miss Susan
- Also known as: Martinsville, U.S.A.
- Genre: Soap opera
- Directed by: Calvin B Jones
- Starring: Susan Peters; Mark Roberts
- Narrated by: Earl Gill
- Country of origin: United States
- Original language: English
- No. of seasons: 1

Production
- Production locations: Philadelphia, Pennsylvania, U.S.
- Running time: 15 minutes

Original release
- Network: NBC
- Release: March 12 – December 28, 1951

Miss Susan is a daytime drama that aired on NBC from March 12 to December 28, 1951. The main writer was William Kendall Clarke. The show, originating from Philadelphia and later retitled Martinsville, U.S.A., aired for 15 minutes at 3:00 p.m. ET on weekdays, and starred Susan Peters, who had previously garnered critical acclaim as a film actress before suffering an accidental gunshot wound that left her paraplegic. It was the first program with a handicapped person as the star.

== Premise ==
Susan Martin is an attorney who moved back to her hometown of Martinsville, Ohio to practice law after she was paralyzed following an auto accident. Soon after Susan returned to town, she had to decide whether or not the family housekeeper, Laura, was an art thief. When not dealing with these matters, Susan agonized over marrying Bill Carter, who wanted to have many children. Susan is unsure if she is able to bear children due to her disability.

== Cast ==
- Susan Peters as Susan Martin
- Mark Roberts as Bill Carter
- Helen Ray as Laura
- Kathryn Gill as Mrs. Peck
- Natalie Priest as the Housekeeper
- Betsy Palmer
- Joseph Foley
- Robert Pike

== Production ==
Actress Susan Peters had garnered attention in films such as Random Harvest before a 1945 hunting accident left her permanently paralyzed from the waist down. Peters returned to films in 1948, with little success. In 1951 NBC approached her to star in her own series.

Peters agreed, later elaborating in an interview: "I'll play a woman lawyer who was injured in an automobile accident. It won't be one of those tearful serials, though." Production on the first episode began in Philadelphia on March 5, 1951. The production however was temporarily delayed after Peters developed the flu and laryngitis upon arriving in Pennsylvania. The program was produced live in the studios of WPTZ-TV.

== Cancellation ==
Some viewers at the time were critical of the series, alleging that NBC had exploited Peters's real-life tragedy. In response, NBC shifted the focus from Susan to other peripheral characters, subsequently retitling the series Martinsville, U.S.A.. However, after these changes failed to attract larger ratings, Colgate, the main sponsor of the series, cancelled it in late 1951, replacing it with The Big Payoff. Peters, who had been in declining health during the series' run, died less than a year after the final episode.

== See also ==
- 1951–52 United States network television schedule (weekday)

== Sources ==
- Schemering, Christopher (1988). The Soap Opera Encyclopedia. New York: Ballantine Books. ISBN 978-0-061-01157-3.
- Terrace, Vincent (2011). Encyclopedia of Television Shows, 1925 through 2010 (2nd ed.). Jefferson, North Carolina: McFarland. ISBN 978-0-7864-6477-7.
