= Life with Snarky Parker (TV series) =

American TV children's series (1950)

- Directed by: Yul Brynner
- Voices of: Bil Baird
- Country of origin: United States

Production
- Producer: Yul Brynner

Original release
- Network: CBS
- Release: January 9 – October 13, 1950

Life with Snarky Parker is an American children's television series that was broadcast on CBS from January 9, 1950, until October 13, 1950.

== Premise ==
Life with Snarky Parker was a "children's serial with a Western setting" with Bil Baird and Cora Baird's puppets as performers and the town of Hot Rock as the setting. Snarky Parker was a deputy sheriff who studied how to be a detective by correspondence classes. He loved Miss Butterball (the teacher in the local school), and he rode a horse named Heathcliffe (who talked). The villain in the series was Ronald Rodent. Other regular characters were Paw, the teacher's father, and Slugger, who played piano in the Bent Elbow Saloon. Altogether the show had approximately 40 characters.

Unlike other early TV shows, such as Howdy Doody and Kukla, Fran and Ollie, that used puppets, Snarky Parker had no humans on screen.

== Production ==
Yul Brynner was the show's producer and director. The puppeteers were the Bairds, Frank Fazakas, and Frank Sullivan. The writers were Bil Baird, Tom Murray, and Paul Peterson. Bil Baird provided Parker's voice.

From its debut through March 1950, Life with Snarky Parker was broadcast from 7:45 to 8 p.m. Eastern Time on Mondays, Tuesdays, Thursdays, and Fridays. From April 1950 through August 1950 it was on Monday-Friday from 6:15 to 6:30 p.m. ET. From September 11, 1950, through October 13, 1950, it was broadcast from 5:15 to 5:30 p.m. ET Monday-Friday.

The show originated in black-and-white live from CBS studios in Grand Central Station.

== Critical response ==
Newspaper columnist Alice Hughes described the puppets in Snarky Parker as "fiendishly clever marionettes" that "are bafflingly lifelike". She noted that she had extended her young son's bedtime so that he could stay up to watch the show.

Critic John Crosby called the Baird marionettes "probably the most ingenious puppets to be seen anywhere on television." He added, "The puppets do things I never saw a puppet do before," citing one character that played a piano, smoked cigarettes, and talked out of the side of his mouth as an example. Crosby found little to like beyond the marionettes. He pointed out "fairly elementary" dialogue and a slow pace as the show's drawbacks.

A review in the trade publication Variety said that the Bairds had "devised a fetching format" for the show. It pointed out the program's "excellent" operation of puppets, saying, "There were lip movements in string-manipulated dolls, and the dummies have good personalities." It also said that the premiere episode had too much talking.

== Comic book ==
Fox Feature Syndicate Inc. published one issue of a Snarky Parker comic book in August 1950. In it, Parker encountered a ghost and a villain as he tried to return gold dust to a cave.

== Snarky Parker short films ==
The Snarky Parker marionette was not new with this series. It existed as early as 1944, when the Bairds made short color films for showing in Central America and South America. The first production, the one-reel "Gardening Is Fun", encouraged people to grow "North American truck vegetables — tomatoes, peas, string beans, carrots, potatoes, radishes." The second in the series was the two-reel "A Boy and His Cow". Set in the Wild West, its purpose was "glorifying the dairy cow." Besides the Bairds' creation of all the puppets in the films, Bil Baird wrote the scripts, directed the films, arranged the music and played some of the instruments.
