= Bride and Groom (TV series) =

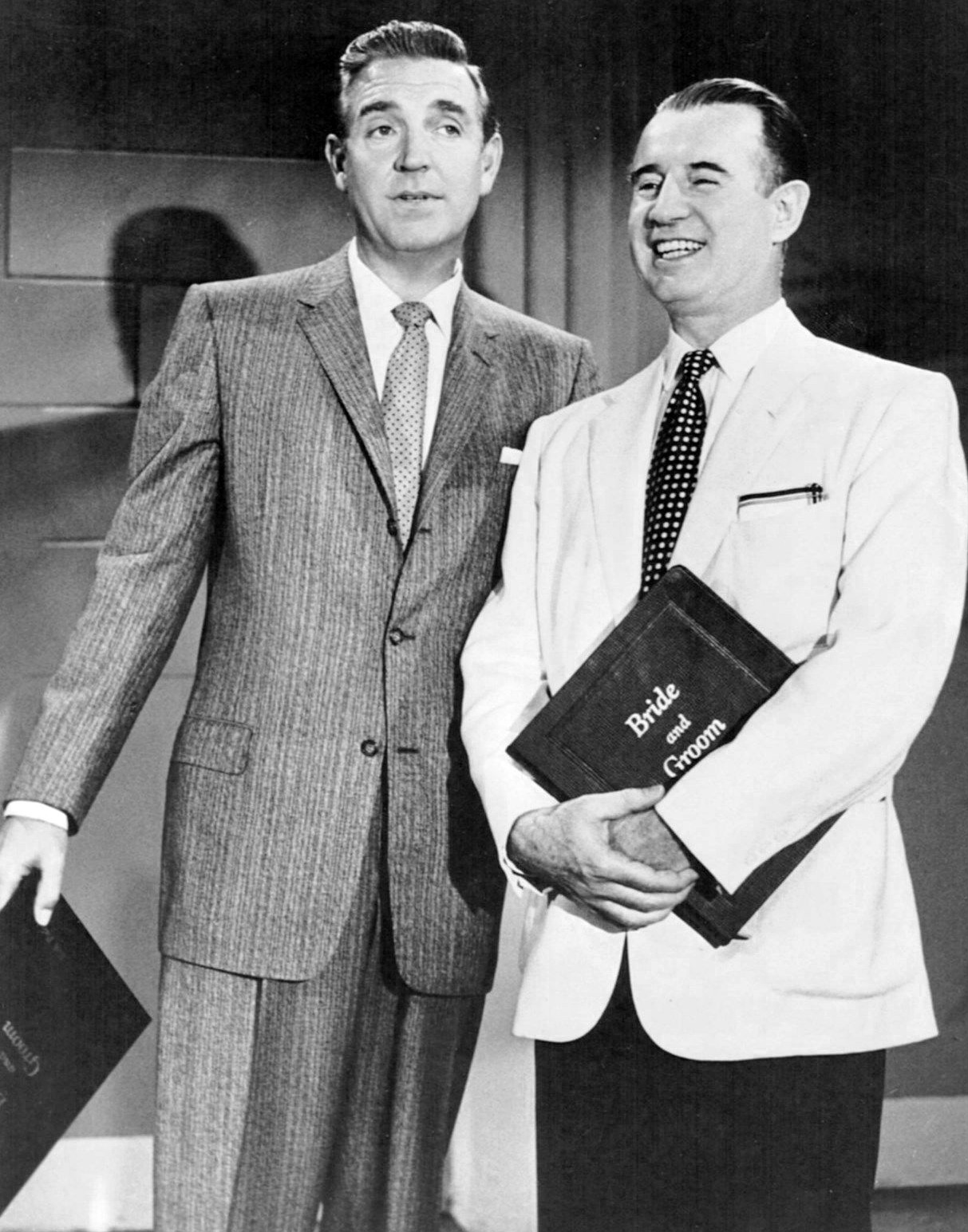
Robert Paige (left) and Frank Parker, hosts of Bride and Groom (1957)

Bride and Groom is a 1951–58 American daytime television series. It was originally broadcast on CBS from January 25, 1951 to October 9, 1953, and then moved to NBC for a run from December 1, 1953 to August 27, 1954. After a pause, the show returned on NBC from July 1, 1957 to January 10, 1958. It could be considered an early reality series. The series presented marriages live on the air, but these couples were not paired specifically for the program. Couples who were intending to get married could apply to be married on the show. The CBS episodes aired in a 15-minute time-slot, with two commercial breaks.

The program was based on a radio series of the same name.

In a 1957 news article, it was stated that the divorce rate of couples married on the show was lower than the national average.

== Format ==
In the CBS version, the couple for the episode would be introduced and talked to. A vocalist would sing a song for them, and a short wedding ceremony would take place. Finally, the couple would be shown their gifts for appearing on the show, such as a basic silver set, a refrigerator, etc.

== Legal case ==
In 1951, a jury in Hollywood, California, awarded $800,000 in damages to John Nelson, John Reddy and John Masterson as the result of a plagiarism suit against KLAC-TV. The producers of Bride and Groom claimed that Wedding Bells on KLAC "closely mirrored" their own program.

== Episode status ==
Three episodes appear on the Internet Archive, and several additional episodes appear on YouTube. Although daytime series were routinely wiped during the 1950s, couples who appeared on the show were sometimes given a 16mm kinescope print of their appearance. In 2012 a couple married on the show celebrated their 60th wedding anniversary, and clips from their episode appeared on CBS This Morning: Saturday.
