= Remember This Date =

- Presented by: Bill Stern
- Country of origin: United States
- Original language: English

Production
- Running time: 30 minutes

Original release
- Network: NBC
- Release: November 14, 1950 – June 28, 1951

Remember This Date is an American game show that aired on NBC from November 14, 1950, to June 28, 1951. The program is most notable for being the first daytime game show.

== Game play ==
The program featured contestants answering questions about events and people connected with the date of the program's broadcast.
