= The Steve Allen Show (1950) =

American television variety show (1950–1952)

- Genre: Variety show
- Presented by: Steve Allen
- Announcer: Bern Bennett
- Theme music composer: Steve Allen
- Opening theme: "The Steve Allen Theme" (later known as "Mister Moon")
- Ending theme: "Impossible"
- Country of origin: United States
- Original language: English

Original release
- Network: CBS
- Release: December 25, 1950 – September 11, 1952

The Steve Allen Show is an American variety television series hosted by Steve Allen and broadcast on CBS from December 25, 1950, to September 11, 1952. It featured piano performances, guest interviews and improvised comedy.

The program initially aired live on weekday evenings from 7:00 to 7:30 p.m. In March 1951, it moved to an hour-long daytime slot from 11:30 a.m. to 12:30 p.m. A six-episode summer version aired from July 3 to September 11, 1952, alternating on Thursday evenings with The Al Pearce Show.

Bern Bennett served as the show's announcer.
