= Arlene Harris =

American actress (1896–1976)

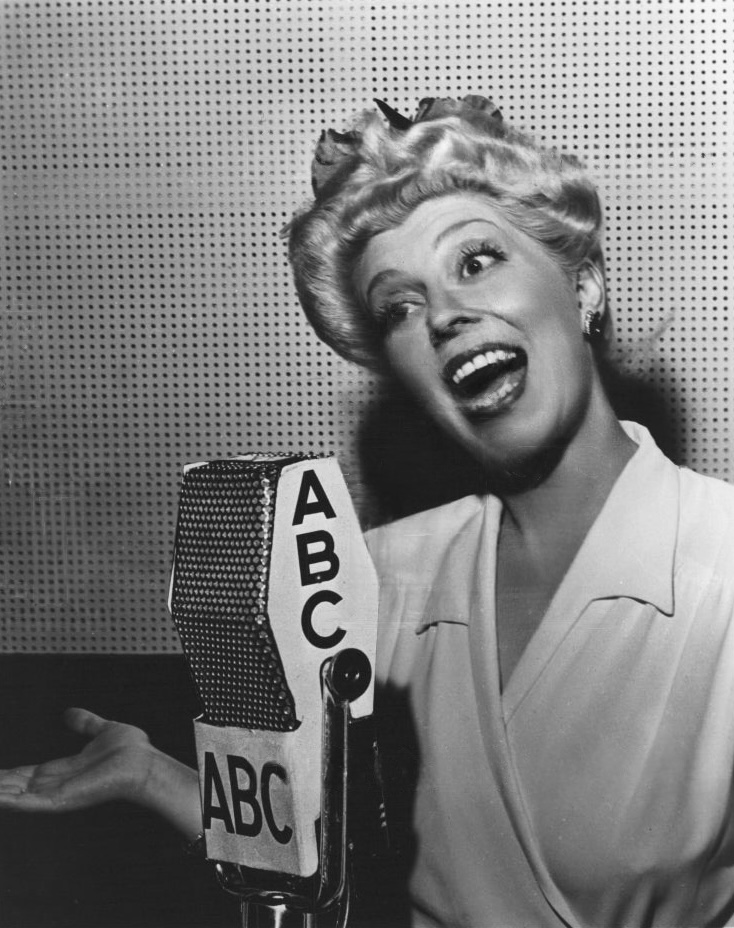
- Harris performing for ABC in 1952
- Born: July 7, 1896; Toronto, Ontario, Canada
- Died: June 12, 1976 (aged 79); Woodland Hills, California, U.S.
- Resting place: Chapel of the Pines Crematory
- Other name: Arlene Francis
- Occupation: Actress
- Spouse: Harry G. Harris

Arlene Harris (July 7, 1896 – June 12, 1976) was a Canadian-born American radio, film, and television actress. (Another source gives her date of birth as July 7, 1898.) She was best known for her role as "the human chatterbox" on Al Pearce's radio program.

== Early years ==
Harris was born in Toronto, Ontario, Canada, and was educated primarily in England. During the first three years of Harris's life, she was unable to hear. At age 5, she was entertaining her family with comedy sketches. When she was older, she "branched out into the art of impersonating."

== Vaudeville ==
Harris toured in vaudeville as Arlene Francis in the 1920s. She had to retire after being injured in an automobile accident, but the Great Depression in the United States caused her to return to entertaining—this time in radio.

== Radio ==
Before her career in film, Harris was well known as a comic actress on the radio program, The Chatterbox.

She first appeared on radio on KFWB in Hollywood, California. She was a regular on Al Pearce and His Gang, where she was known as "The Human Chatterbox" in monologues that involved telephone conversations with an unheard friend. A CBS statistician once calculated that she averaged four words per second during one of her rapid-fire monologues. She also co-starred with Pearce in Here Comes Elmer.

Harris played Mummy Higgins on The Baby Snooks Show and was heard on Ina Ray Hutton's program and Fare for Ladies.

== Television ==
Harris played herself in an episode of The Dick Van Dyke Show in 1964,. She also appeared on Panorama Pacific and made guest appearances on several TV programs.

== Recognition ==
Harris has a star at 6250 Hollywood Boulevard in the Radio section of the Hollywood Walk of Fame. It was dedicated February 8, 1960.

== Personal life ==
Harris was married to Dr. Harry G. Harris.

== Death ==
Harris died June 12, 1976, at the Motion Picture Country Home in Woodland Hills, California. She is entombed in Chapel of the Pines Crematory at Los Angeles, California.
