= Sturz =

Sturz is a surname. Notable people with the surname include:

- Elizabeth Lyttleton Sturz (1917–2010), American folklorist
- Herb Sturz (1930–2021), American activist
- Lisa Sturz (born 1955), American puppeteer
