= Herb Sturz =

American social justice advocate (1930–2021)

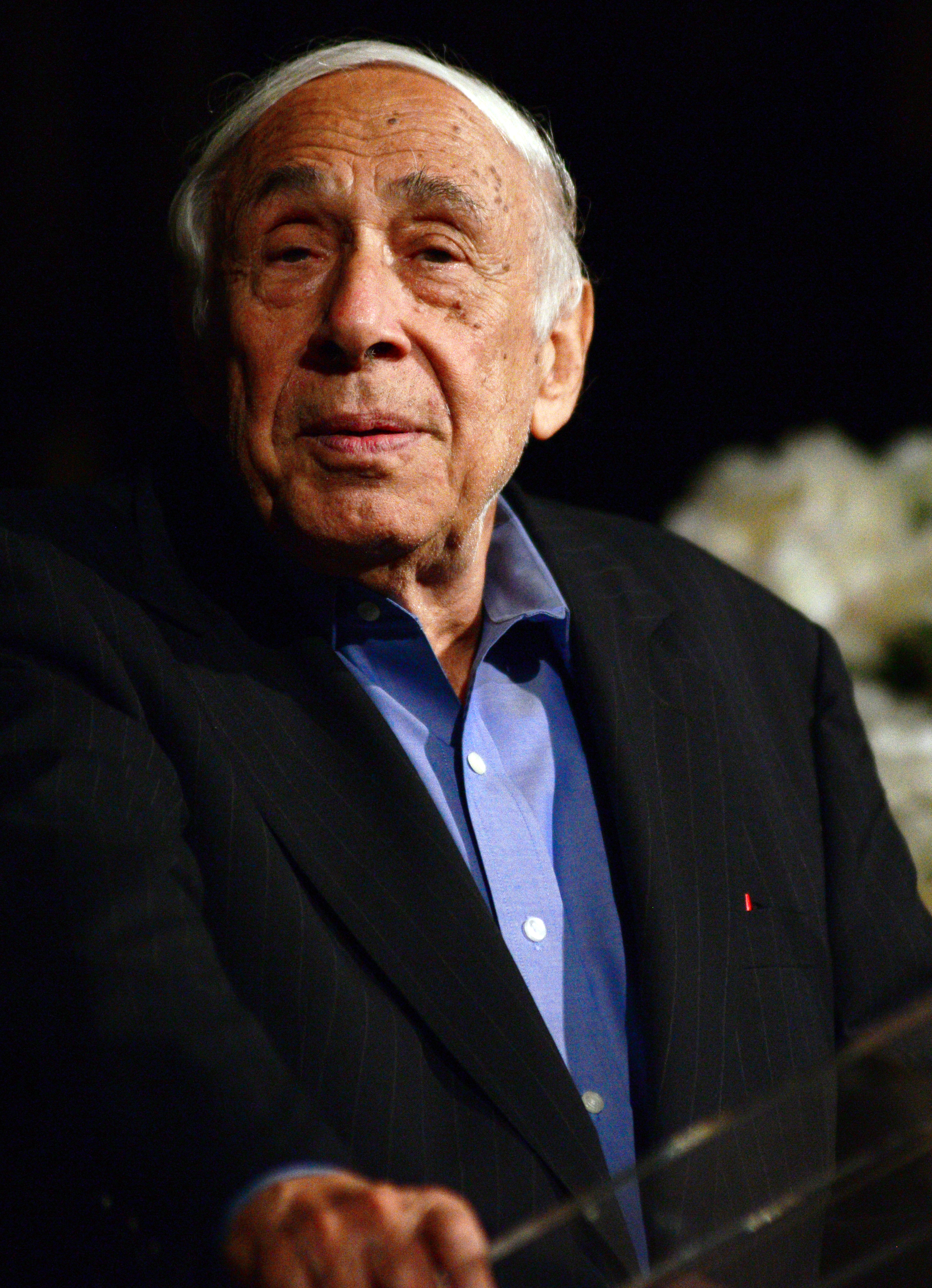
- Sturz in 2017
- Born: Herbert Jay Sturz; December 31, 1930; Bayonne, New Jersey, US
- Died: June 10, 2021 (aged 90); Tucson, Arizona, US
- Education: University of Wisconsin—Madison; Teachers College, Columbia University
- Occupations: Social Justice Advocate; Social Entrepreneur; Social Scientist
- Employers: Vera Institute of Justice: Co-Founder, Executive Director; New York City: Deputy Mayor for Criminal Justice, Planning Commission Chair; The New York Times: Editorial Board Member; Open Society Foundations: Board Member, Senior Advisor
- Spouses: Elizabeth Lyttleton Sturz (m. 1958; died 2010) Margaret L. Shaw (m. 2012; died 2017)

Herbert Jay Sturz (December 31, 1930 – June 10, 2021) was an American social justice advocate, nonprofit executive, and political appointee. Sturz had a broad impact on public policy, especially in New York City. He was: chairman of the New York City Planning Commission; New York City deputy mayor for criminal justice; and a New York Times editorial board member. He was the founding director of the Vera Institute of Justice and a 12-year board member for George Soros's Open Society Foundations. In 1976 Sturz received the Rockefeller Public Service Award at the White House.

== Early life and education ==
Sturz was born in Bayonne, New Jersey, the youngest of three sons. His parents were Ida (née Meirowitz), a travel agency owner, and Jacob Sturcz (also Sturz), an insurance agency owner. Jacob was born on December 18, 1889 in Hrabkov, Slovakia and immigrated to America on July 8, 1908. Ida was born in Manhattan, New York in May 1900. They were both of Ashkenazi Jewish descent. Sturz was the youngest of three sons. The oldest was Robert (Bob) Sturz, a New York lawyer. The middle son was Melvin (Mel) Sturz, who was an insurance broker in Bayonne and New York. One of his nieces was Lisa Sturz.

Sturz attended Horace Mann Elementary School in Bayonne and graduated from Bayonne High School in 1948. Before graduating, he was a newspaper boy, worked at his father's bar, and was a soda jerk. Sturz was the tennis team captain in high school. During his senior year, he started dropping his tennis racket and had difficulty scooping ice cream. Sturz soon learned he had polio, which permanently weakened and disfigured his hands. Sturz enrolled at the University of Wisconsin, where his two older brothers went to college. Sturz majored in philosophy, was a political activist, and graduated in 1952.

== Early career as a writer ==
After graduating from college, Sturz returned to the New York area, worked various odd jobs and wrote a screenplay with Natalie d'Arbeloff called The Peacemaker. The script was optioned by Louis de Rochemont but the film was never produced. Sturz then enrolled at Columbia Teachers College, where he earned a master's degree in English. In 1954, Sturz went to Italy in further pursuit of a writing career. He was a news correspondent in Positano, Italy and met his future wife Elizabeth Lyttleton. Sturz and Lyttleton moved to Malaga, Spain to research and write a book about life in Francoist Spain. Fearing reprisals, they smuggled the text out in small booklets to Gibraltar and made their way back to Princeton. Their book, Reapers of the Storm, was published in 1958.

Sturz and Lyttleton returned to the United States in 1958, married, and Sturz became an editor at Boy's Life magazine. While there he wrote a comic book supplement: America's Heritage: The Bill of Rights, which received the Silver Gavel Award from the American Bar Association in 1962. The gap between the assurances in the Bill of Rights and actual practice, especially as they relate to the criminal justice system, was a theme throughout Sturz's career.

== Vera Institute of Justice (1961 to 1977) ==
In 1960 (at age 29) while working at Boy's Life, Sturz used his company connections to create a foundation to improve youth pretrial detention. Sturz sought funding from prominent philanthropists, including Louis Schweitzer, the industrialist and philanthropist with a keen interest in civil rights. Sturz secured $500 ($5,500 in 2025 dollars) for exploratory work from Schweitzer, but did not produce a tangible result. Sturz set another appointment with Schweitzer, but to Schweitzer's surprise, Sturz was not asking for more money; he was returning $250.

Schweitzer was impressed by Sturz's integrity and passion and decided to employ him in February 1961. Sturz's starting salary was $8,000 a year ($86,700 in 2025 dollars). This was the start of the Vera Institute of Justice.

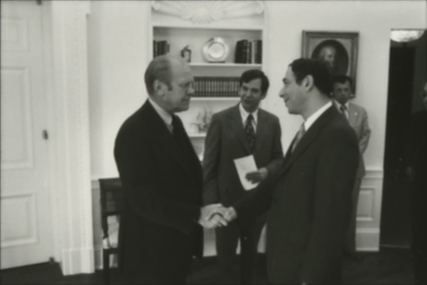
Herbert Sturz with Gerald Ford in Oval Office, December 1, 1976

Sixteen years later, on December 1, 1976 (age 45), Sturz went to the White House Oval Office and received the Rockefeller Public Service Award from President Gerald Ford for his outstanding work in the area of the Administration of Justice and the Reduction of Crime.

A pioneer in the development of imaginative programs in criminal justice, Herbert Sturz has spearheaded innovative approaches to solving the problems of unjust bail practices, employment of ex-offenders, alcoholism, and drug abuse. These successful efforts have led to the development of similar programs in other cities in this country, as well as in London and Paris. He has been a leader in creating model programs--such as the Wildcat Service Corporation--which provide basic work skills and jobs for persons unable to cope with competitive employment situations. His initiatives demonstrate that a small private agency, such as the Vera Institute of Justice, can have a profound effect on government programs.

Sturz's projects during his 17 years at Vera are documented in Vera's online archives, websites, government publications, journals, and newspaper articles. Many Sturz/Vera programs and studies have become standards against which similar efforts are compared in mission, experimental design, and results.

=== Manhattan Bail Project (1961) ===
Sturz's first Vera project was to investigate and find practical ways to reform Manhattan's pretrial services program (bail). Sturz gained access to the judicial system through Schweitzer's connections with and contributions to NYU School of Law and Mayor Robert F. Wagner Jr. Sturz interviewed arrestees and attended bail hearings. He noted that bail decisions were heavily influenced by independent bail bondsmen, and that biographical information about the accused and their ties to the community were seldom presented to the magistrate or judge.

Sturz designed a study to test increased use of release on their own recognizance (ROR, or release without bail). NYU law students supervised by Vera conducted, verified, and scored defendant surveys to assess appropriateness for ROR. Based on the defendant's score, Vera could recommend ROR to the Legal Aid Society and the District Attorney's Office. If they agreed, Vera's ROR recommendation would be presented to the magistrate or judge at the bail hearing. A control group was part of the test, where half of Vera's positive ROR recommendations were randomly withheld. Sturz's bail project showed initial signs of effectiveness, and won the support of Chief City Magistrate Abraham M. Bloch and Chief Justice John M. Murtagh of Special Sessions. In October 1961, Mayor Wagner approved Vera's proposed one-year bail study.

Enthusiasm for the project built quickly. In January and December 1962, it was described in two criminal justice journals. In August, it was reported in the New York Times that 99% of defendants on ROR returned for trial. In January 1963, it was reported that 98% of ROR defendants appeared in court. In March 1993 US Deputy Attorney General Nicholas Katzenbach urged federal judges to broaden the use of the personal recognizance procedure.

Katzenbach issued his policy statement based on a set of personal recognizance recommendations in the Attorney General's Committee on Poverty and the Administration of Federal Criminal Justice Report (chaired by Francis A. Allen). Those recommendations were based on Vera's Manhattan findings and a gratis Vera study of the federal courts in the Southern District of New York. Sturz and Vera are frequently referenced the Allen Committee report. Sturz met Burke Marshall when Vera's findings and recommendations were presented to the Allen Committee. Marshall later became Vera's first board chairman in 1966.

Under the co-sponsorship of the US Department of Justice and Vera, a working paper was written: Bail in the United States: 1964. It was presented at the National Conference on Bail and Criminal Justice, May 27–29, 1964. The Conference's advisory committee had Attorney General Robert F. Kennedy and Schweitzer as ex-officio members. Supreme Court Justice William J. Brennan Jr. was on the advisory committee. The keynote address, which Sturz helped write, was delivered by Chief Justice Earl Warren. The Conference was attended by eight of the nine Supreme Court justices.

Sturz is highlighted in the Conference report Acknowledgement: "Herbert J. Sturz, the Director of the Manhattan Bail Project and the Co-Director of this Conference, contributed enormously to our knowledge about alternatives to the present bail system." Another person recognized in the Acknowledgement was Jack Rosenthal, assistant to RFK at the time, and eventual winner of the Pulitzer Prize in Journalism in 1982. Sturz and Rosenthal remained close friends for the rest of their lives.

The Manhattan Bail Project evolved into the Pretrial Services Agency (PTSA) in 1973, and then into the New York City Criminal Justice Agency (CJA) in 1977. A June 1980 study found that defendants with community ties appeared for court more often than defendants who did not. Community ties information also increased the court's confidence and speed in making release decisions.

=== Manhattan Bowery Project (1965) ===
The next Sturz/Vera project focused on the Bowery, a neighborhood in the Lower East Side of Manhattan. The Bowery was a major statistical outlier in the Manhattan Bail Project; these arrestees often did not appear for court despite qualifying for release without bail. Sturz did a preliminary investigation and found that the neighborhood had an overwhelming level of public drunkenness, and derelicts were often in a cycle of arrest, detention, release, and rearrest. In 1965, Sturz asked Rosemary Masters, a new Vera hire and Harvard Law graduate, to research the problem further and write a project plan and budget. When she asked who should be project administrator, Sturz said, "Well, you of course."

Vera obtained approval for a pilot program from New York Mayor John Lindsay in November 1966. It was funded as part of a $1.1 million, five-year grant from the Ford Foundation. Sturz, Masters, a plainclothes policeman, and a Vera recovering alcoholic drove around the Bowery in an unmarked patrol wagon. When they found a drunk person on the sidewalk, the foursome asked if they would like to sleep it off in a clean, safe place. If they said yes, they were taken to a 12-bed Men's Shelter operated by New York's Department of Social Services. If they sobered up by day three, they were eligible for a bed in the Bowery Mission, a nonprofit shelter. The test easily filled the beds in half a day and the test was viewed as a more humane way to address public drunkenness.

After the Bowery pilot success, a full-scale alcohol treatment and diversion effort started in late 1967 as the Manhattan Bowery Corporation. It worked with multiple city agencies and St. Vincent's Hospital. Two-man teams, one officer and one Rescue Aid/recovering alcoholic, would find a drunk person on the sidewalk and invite them to the treatment infirmary as an alternative to arrest for public drunkenness. They went through detoxification and were offered therapeutic and rehabilitative services. In a 1972 project evaluation, it was found that 68% of patients were placed in after care programs and Bowery arrests for public intoxication decreased 96%.

Eventually, the Manhattan Bowery Corporation became Project Renewal. Its scope expanded from alcohol detoxification into a comprehensive program to: "... end the cycle of homelessness by empowering individuals and families to renew their lives with health, homes, and jobs." Now, Project Renewal: "... has grown into one of the city's largest social services agencies, reaching over 10,000 people each year."

=== Manhattan Court Employment Project (1968) ===
The Manhattan Court Employment Project (MCEP) created by Sturz and Vera was the nation's first formal pretrial diversion program for juvenile offenders. The MCEP screening and assessment tools were designed to detect narcotics addicts and anyone not seriously motivated to find better employment.

In the first year of operation, the project found that it was failing to detect and screen out drug addicts: 23% of approved program participants were addicts, especially to heroin, despite no prior drug arrests and no signs of addiction during their screening interview. Further, participants who were already charged with minor violations had light penalties and hence low motivation to participate enthusiastically in the jobs program. For these and other reasons, only 39% of participants found employment during the program's first year. While MCEP helped some participants, its overall success rate was disappointing.

After the first year of operation, the MCEP process was modified to encourage participants to exert more effort during their first 90 days to gain and retain employment. The program improved: after 14 months in the program, 70% of participants who had their charges dismissed were still employed.

The MCEP spun off from Vera in 1970 as the Court Employment Project (CEP). In December 1979 another effectiveness study was conducted by Vera. It concluded that CEP's recommendations to divert a juvenile offender from the criminal justice system into social service programs were statistically identical to prosecutors' referrals without CEP. Consequently, CEP dropped its diversion recommendation role, narrowed its focus to delivering effective employment services for court-deferred youths, and became a division of CASES (Center for Alternative Sentencing and Employment Services).

=== Addiction Research and Treatment Corporation (1969) ===
In early 1969, NYC Mayor John Lindsay faced rising crime. He asked Sturz and Vera to test an ambulatory methadone maintenance program. A prior state-wide methadone program had limited impact and its additional funding request had been rejected by the state. Vera's initial research and testing showed sufficient promise, so the Addiction Research and Treatment Corporation (ARTC) was created.

ARTC was a five-year experimental program by the National Institute of Mental Health, the Department of Housing and Urban Development (through its Model Cities program), and New York City. It started in the Bedford Stuyvesant neighborhood of Brooklyn and served its first client in October 1969. ARTC had minimal admission criteria. "Thus ARTC would treat addicts with long histories of criminal activity, unsuccessful experiences in other programs, and those who were unemployed."

ARTC's rigorous 1975 examination of its program, with grant support from Vera and others, found that only 23% of all clients stayed in the program for more than three years. These clients had fewer drug-related arrests, but their arrest rate for other crimes did not decline. Only 31% of three-year participants had worked more than 13 months. Results were worse for clients who quit or were discharged from the program.

Vera's venture into addiction treatment did not produce persuasive treatment outcomes. But ARTC's research method provided a benchmark for testing addiction treatment. Indeed, ARTC's research team found only one other methadone study with a sufficiently robust design to compare results with. An important finding in the research highlighted the lack of employment for ex-addicts. This finding led Sturz to explore new employment programs for ex-addicts.

=== Neighborhood Youth Diversion Project (1970) ===
A second Vera program targeting juvenile offenders (MCEP being the first) was launched in 1970. It focused on the East Tremont neighborhood in the Bronx, and delivered two youth diversion services: counseling for individuals and families, and mediation as an alternative to court trial. In 1979, the program shifted from criminal justice to child welfare services and became an independent organization as Neighborhood Youth and Family Services. By October 2000, the organization focused on reducing child placement into foster care through substance abuse treatment, parenting classes, and legal advocacy. As of late 2025, NYC Neighborhood Services administers the Tremont Neighborhood Health Action Center and a standalone Neighborhood Youth and Family Services organization no longer operates in Tremont.

=== Pioneer Messenger Service (1971) / Wildcat Service Corporation (1972) ===
Sturz wanted Vera to further explore ways to support the return of ex-addicts to mainstream society through employment. Several small-scale test projects were explored, and Pioneer Messenger Service offered the most promise. In two years, Pioneer had 300 clients and won a contract with City University of New York. Sturz and Vera then launched a full-scale work program in July 1972: Wildcat Service Corporation.

Wildcat "was the first organization in the United States to design and implement a transitional work program for unemployed persons with criminal convictions. Wildcat recognized that the training and experience acquired through transitional employment would open pathways to work for individuals with barriers." Wildcat's first CEO was Amalia Betanzos. During her tenure, she worked under four NYC mayors.

By the end of 1973, Wildcat had 677 employees. One top client was the New York Police Department. "Wildcat employees—93% of whom have arrest records—are inventorying forms and equipment for the police, assembling, painting and delivering police crowd-control barriers, painting and maintaining police stations, and providing a flat tire pickup and delivery service for patrol cars."

By the end of 1974, Wildcat had 1,400 employees. After six months, employees were evaluated for readiness to work outside of Wildcat. If ready, Wildcat or Vera helped them find jobs, or they could find non-Wildcat jobs on their own. After one year in operation, 20% of Wildcat workers were promoted to non-subsidized positions in business or government agencies. After two years, 40% were in outside jobs. And 76% of those who moved into outside work retained their positions. On the down side, 25% of hires were terminated for cause in their first year and another 5% resigned. Despite terminations and departures, 62% of Wildcat workers were working after one year and 57% were working after two years.

At the end of its second year, Wildcat employees were compared to randomly selected group of non-Wildcat individuals with similar post-addiction and post-incarceration challenges. Twice as many people who started at Wildcat still had jobs at the end of the year when compared to the non-Wildcat control group. Further, Wildcat employees had 33% fewer arrests than their non-Wildcat counterparts. When combining employment and arrest results, 59% of Wildcat employees were successful compared to 27% of the control group.

By the end of 1975, Wildcat had 1,250 employees. In 2011, Wildcat joined The Fedcap Group. The move enabled Wildcat and Fedcap to "offer a wider range of programs, career tracks and job opportunities to the people we serve."

=== Legal Action Center (1973) ===
The Legal Action Center (LAC) started operations in July 1973. It was initially sponsored by Vera and then became a separate entity with an independent board and funding sources. Sturz served on LAC's first board of directors along with Vera's chairman Burke Marshall. Arthur L. Liman was its first board chairman.

LAC originally focused on serving convicts and drug abusers who experienced discrimination in licensing laws and regulations, public and private employment practices, and bonding policies that bar ex-offenders. Its scope then expanded during the AIDS epidemic to help protect the rights of infected persons. In 1977, LAC successfully brought litigation that ended some of the harshest provisions of the Rockefeller Drug Laws. In 1979 LAC helped establish the right to work for people in methadone treatment programs. In the same year, it successfully challenged the US Postal Service's practice of not hiring people with non-work-related arrest records. LAC continued is successful litigation record through 50 years of operation.

As of late 2025, LAC remains a vital legal organization fighting discrimination, building health equity, and restoring opportunities.

=== V/WAP / Victim Service Agency / Safe Horizon (1974) ===
Planning for the Victim/Witness Assistance Project (V/WAP) began at Vera in 1974. The project created a computerized case management system and expedited court appearance notifications. These and other steps would hopefully save civilians and police wasted trips to court, and increase civilian court appearance rates. In July 1975, V/WAP started in Brooklyn's Criminal Court. After one year of operation, wasted trips by police and civilians were greatly reduced. Civilian appearance rates at court, unfortunately, did not improve.

In 1978, the Victim Service Agency (VSA) was authorized by Mayor Koch, and reported directly to Sturz (then NYC Deputy Mayor of Criminal Justice). VSA absorbed V/WAP in the Fall of 1978. One aspect of VSA was to administer restitution programs in Brooklyn and Bronx criminal courts. An evaluation in October 1980 found that significant non-payment problems persisted.

By 1981, VSA served victims of domestic violence with shelters, counseling, and other support programs. In 2000, VSA became Safe Horizon, which became the largest victim service organization in the US, with 250,000 clients every year.

=== Inner London Project (1975) ===
The goal of Inner London Probation and After-Care Service (ILPAS) was to deliver verified community ties information about defendants to magistrates. Vera's experience with the Manhattan Bail Project was used as a resource. Vera created a London office, with Michael E. Smith as its director, and he managed the Inner London project.

=== Easyride (1976) ===
Easyride was developed by Vera to test whether ex-addicts and ex-offenders could deliver safe, reliable, and cost-effective door-to-door transportation services for those who cannot use regular public transportation due to physical or mental impairments. The test began in June 1976 with three drivers, one attendant, one reservation clerk, an operations manager, and three leased vehicles. The service area focused on serving the Lower East Side.

Easyride entered a second phase starting in June 1979. Two major changes were made. The service area expanded to include the Lower West Side, and drivers were not exclusively ex-addicts and ex-offenders from Vera programs like Wildcat. This was done to expand the service area and funding. Both objectives were accomplished. By April 1982, Easyride was providing an average of 5,400 trips per month. Cost per trip dropped slightly by the last year of Phase II despite an increase in rider fees, cessation of uptown trips, larger service area, and additional capital expenditures (e.g., fleet size, computerization, and communications). The cost per trip decline was also aided by an increase in nutritional trips, which facilitated ride sharing.

== NYC Deputy Mayor/Coordinator for Criminal Justice (1978–1979) ==
On December 31, 1977 mayor-elect Ed Koch called Sturz on his birthday (age 47) and offered him the job of deputy mayor of criminal justice. Sturz wanted to accept and called Burke Marshall, Vera's board chairman. Burke supported Sturz's move to City Hall and replaced Sturz with Michael E. Smith (then managing the London office) in Sturz's role as Vera's president.

On January 4, 1978, the New York Times preannounced that Sturz was to be named deputy mayor of criminal justice by mayor Koch. Sturz's salary was to be $50,970 (about $253,000 in 2025 dollars) and it was reported that Vera's annual operating budget was $6 million (about $32 million in 2025 dollars).

The Sturz appointment was hailed as wise on the Times editorial page: "Mr. Sturz's advice has been sought by successive mayors, by Washington, even by foreign governments. His appointment will do much to insure that New York City's criminal justice system does justice for the public, and to itself." And: "Despite a lack of city government experience, Mr. Sturz was generally considered a good choice to coordinate the troubled criminal justice programs because of his background as head of the Vera Institute of Justice, an organization that, has sponsored campaigns for bail reform, prisoner rehabilitation and other programs." Koch said he expected his new deputy: "To ensure that the people, not bureaucratic empires, are served." Sturz said he "leapt" at Koch's offer to work for the city and said he would "try to make the system a little more efficient and fairer."

=== 1978 ===
- In January, Koch asked Sturz to investigate NYC "Police Department charges that lack of cooperation by fire marshals had impeded investigations into arson‐related homicides." In August, Koch formed an arson task force and placed Sturz in charge. The task force recommended that the "Police Department would take over the overall supervision of arson cases, including criminal investigations, with fire marshals restricted to investigating the forensic and scientific aspects of each case." The Uniformed Firefighters Association objected; they wanted full authority over all arson cases. The recommendation went to Koch late in 1978. Since there was no financing to support for arson investigation enhancements, the task force applied to the Federal Law Enforcement Assistance Administration (LEAA) for a $100,000 grant.
- In February, Koch launched a new effort to set tougher zoning restrictions to discourage new pornography establishments. Sturz headed the task force. He and Robert F. Wagner Jr. (Planning Commission chairman) said they would have a "comprehensive" plan aimed at cleaning up the area in two months for legislative consideration. A Times Square clean-up plan plan was sent to Koch mid-May.
- In March, Koch announced a pilot project to reduce arraignment delays would soon start in Brooklyn, and that he would create a Victim Service Agency.
- In April, Sturz initiated a test with Kings County District Attorney Eugene Gold to reduce misdemeanor case loads by co-locating the complaint room in the police central-booking area. With the prosecutor and the arresting officer both present with the accused and the victim, inappropriate cases could be screened out and others could use mediation.
- In April, Sturz met with state representatives to explore their interest in buying Rikers Island. Sturz proposed selling Rikers to the state. A decision seemed close by November: "The State Legislature appropriated $35 million for the first stage of the deal and the city persuaded Kenneth Schoen, a national authority on prisons, to help Corrections Commissioner William Ciuros oversee the operation. It should be only a matter of weeks before the city can begin selling cells — and Creating better ones."
- In June, Sturz and a task force decided to phase out the complaint-ridden Spofford juvenile detention center. A plan to pursue new "community corrections" facilities was approved in November.
- In June, Koch assigned Sturz and others to "recommend strategies to reduce racial, religious and ethnic tensions in the city."
- In July, Sturz was asked to prepare plans for a mass arrest, such as from a black-out. The plan was for the deputy police commissioner for criminal justice and Sturz's assistant coordinator for criminal justice to immediately go to the operations room at Police Headquarters in such an event. McPartland would oversee the Police Department's arrest processing, and Haesloop would coordinate across the rest of the criminal justice system.

=== 1979 ===
- In January, a special committee of New York City law‐enforcement officials met and recommended: strengthening prosecutors' powers, curtailing grand jurys, and deemphasizing gambling and prostitution laws. Sturz was on the committee.
- Sturz asked for a delay on evicting neighboring Times Square merchants to expand the Under 21 youth shelter expansion.
- Sturz backed Koch in a sweeping program to combat subway crime. Police officers would ride all trains during evening hours, and shorter trains would run at night. The program's first week of operation was said to cut subway crime by 40%. Others were doubtful. Koch asked Sturz to double check the initial findings. Sturz found "complex and unorthodox" reporting methods, but said the mistakes were not intentional.
- Sturz opposed the Carter Administration's intention to cut LEAA funds by $102 million in 1980: "This recommendation bespeaks an absence of Presidential commitment to a Federal anti‐crime assistance effort."
- In February, Koch approved and announced Sturz's comprehensive jail reform program: Create a Juvenile Justice Agency to coordinate all punishment and detention of the city's youthful offenders. Close the notorious Spofford jail within two years. Build four new high‐security facilities near the courthouses in every borough except Staten Island.
- In June, the State and NYC completed a Rikers lease agreement. Sturz said: "It gives us the opportunity to build modern, constitutional, humane facilities near the courthouses."
- In June, Sturz disagreed with the assessment of a newly formed, independent Citizens Crime Commission.
- In July, Sturz headed a commission to the Pentagon to seek military involvement to demolish or seal up abandoned buildings in NYC.
- In July, Sturz backed a test of conducting night jury trials for felony cases to reduce backlogs. Sturz said "the courts might fall short of their goals, but that "we should give them a chance, give them a year."
- In July, controversy surrounding the lease of Rikers rose. A new report indicated operating costs would increase and faulted some of Sturz's Rikers report. The lease deal with the state was in jeopardy.
- In August, Koch demoted Sturz to Coordinator of Criminal Justice in a reorganization of the mayor's office.
- In August, Sturz supported the replacement of William J. Ciuros Jr., Commissioner of Corrections, with Benjamin Ward. It was rumored that Ciuros opposed the lease of Rikers to the state, and this may have led to his resignation.
- In September, Koch supported a study by Sturz and placed the Transit Authority police under the command of the city's Police Department. Housing police were also moved into the city's Police Department.
- In September, Sturz helped resolve the Times Square dispute involving the Under 21 expansion. The state donated Covenant House to address needed capacity.

== NYC Planning Commission Chairman (1980–1986) ==
In a major career shift for Sturz, and a personnel risk for Koch, Sturz was placed in charge of the NYC Planning Commission. The appointment was announced in December 1979. Sturz's new position increased his pay to $57,500 ($226,100 in 2025 dollars). Concerns were initially expressed about this lack of urban planning experience.

=== 1980 ===
- In January, Sturz assumed charge over the controversial NYC Coastal Zone Management Plan. Its mission was to win Federal funds to cut coastal erosion, improve public access to the waterfront and lessen the impact of energy production along the shoreline.
- In March, Sturz broke up the Urban Design Group and divided members among the five boroughs. His intent was to strengthen the borough offices "without weakening our commitment to improve the quality of design" of the city.
- In April, Sturz supported funding for handheld devices to print parking tickets and other infractions. The devices also accessed background information on violators of city rules.
- In April, Sturz hired a law firm to help fight costly federal regulations surrounding rebuilding city roads, sewers, and transportation facilities.
- In July, Sturz initiated research into rezoning Midtown, a highly controversial issue.
- In September, Sturz continued work on a plan to balance loft conversions with supporting local manufacturing.
- In October, Sturz supported the development of an office tower, apartments, and possibly a hotel and department store on the vacant site of the old Madison Square Garden.
- In November, Sturz indicated the city hoped to have a final Midtown rezoning plan ready by spring for a six-month review process.

=== 1981 ===
- In January, Sturz began a study of proposals to erect hotel or luxury apartments over landmark Seventh Regiment Armory.
- In February, Sturz's Planning Commission approved the transfer of city park land along the East River to the Helmsley real estate interests in exchange for two private parks in Tudor City. Koch later reversed his support for the swap. A revised plan was sent to the City Board of Estimate in April.
- In March, the Planning Commission approved a plan to sell development rights over a midtown firehouse on the West Side. Sturz said: "This is a potential growth area and we want to encourage the movement of development from east to west."
- In April, the Planning Commission approved the first legislation in over a decade regulating conversions of industrial and commercial lofts in Manhattan to residential use. Sturz said the legislation would create a disincentive for illegal conversion and insure the vitality of the city's commercial and manufacturing areas.
- In June, the Planning Commission proposed a set of zoning and tax incentives to encourage construction of office and residential buildings west of the Avenue of the Americas.
- In June, Sturz said the Planning Commission was considering a "pilot project to help the 'structured underclass' - the permanently unemployed who are on public assistance." The plan would allow indigent hospital patients to receive outpatient care at home. The money saved would be used to hire unemployed people as drivers to transport patients.
- In October, Sturz discussed plans to relocate seven major law firms to Times Square. This would help increase development on the West Side.
- In December, the Planning Commission's law firm started negotiations on a cable plan for the four outlying boroughs.

=== 1982 ===
- In January, The Portman Hotel construction plan revealed that a Broadway Plaza pedestrian mall would be created by diverting motor traffic from Broadway. Sturz said: "It's part of the whole rejuvenation of Midtown, West side." Objections to the plan were appealed all the way to the US Supreme Court, but finally lost. In May, support for the Broadway Plaza mall weakened.
- In March, The Planning Commission adopted new zoning for midtown to steer development toward the south and West Side. The plan was approved by the Board of Estimate in May. Delays may have limited the impact of the new zoning.
- In March, a Man in the News article featured Sturz. John E. Zuccotti, said: "I have to hand it to Herb. He not only has a true vision of the city, but his low-key style belies the tough and shrewd negotiator inside." Robert F. Wagner Jr., said: "I think the results after two years are very positive." Wagner cited loft dwelling in lower Manhattan and cable TV expansion into the boroughs as Sturz successes. Sturz said he wanted to "scatter the menacing aspects" of 42nd Street elsewhere where it can be more easily controlled.
- In March, Koch and the Planning Commission asked a developer to withdraw their Lincoln West application. A new environmental impact study was needed. In September, Sturz said the Planning Commission would review objections from City Council about Lincoln West, but Sturz remained optimistic.
- In April, four to five developers were chosen by NYC and the State Urban Development Corporation as primary builders for a Times Square redevelopment plan. Sturz cautioned that suits by owners of pornographic book stores could prolong the project. Sturz said construction would not begin until 1984.
- In July, Sturz is interviewed about how the Planning Commission wants to help the other Boroughs. For example, they could create development grants for the city's poorer sections.
- In September, objections were raised to building a detention center in Chinatown, and multi-use alternatives were proposed to the Planning Commission for the lower floors of the building.
- In September, the Planning Commission made the rare move of revoking a developer permit in Chinatown.
- In September, Sturz accelerated the precertification stage of development project reviews.
- In November, Sturz asserted that the City has jurisdiction over billboard advertising on rail lines in the city, especially when they violate residential zoning.
- In December, Sturz moved to block efforts to build master satellite dishes to circumvent the city's slow-moving cable project.
- In December, Sturz supported the appointment of Ellen Schall to Commissioner of Juvenile Justice.

=== 1983 ===
- In January, Sturz said the city must plan for an aging population and de-emphasize institutional care. In February, Sturz wrote an Opinion for the New York Times calling for door-to-door transportation for the elderly and disabled and the use of home health care to reduce costs. In March, Jack Rosenthal wrote an Opinion for the New York Times supporting Sturz's proposal for increased home health care. He reasoned it would result in better care for the elderly and disabled and would create more jobs.
- In January, Sturz signed a group letter to the New York Times suggesting that it was time for the Century Club to drop its male membership restriction.
- In February, the Planning Commission banned tall, narrow residences and sent it to the Board of Estimate for final action.
- In February, the Planning Commission urged for green belt preservation on Staten Island.
- In February, Sturz voted to grant a tax abatement to Bank Leumi in Chinatown: "We felt that the use there of commercial space would help stabilize that block, that area, that whole community."
- In March, Koch delivered a speech Sturz helped write proposing a national program for 18-year-old adults to spend time in community service.
- In March, a major law firm decided to move its law offices to the West Side, in support of Sturz's plan to shift city growth from east to west.
- In April, a dispute surfaced over developing 70 acres of rundown Pepsico land in the Hunters Point section of Long Island City. The Port Authority complained their role in the process was reduced.
- In April, Koch said he added long-term city planning to Sturz's role on the Planning Commission.
- In May, a California developer wanted to rejoin the Times Sq. and 42nd Street project. In August, two developers competed for the Times Square Redevelopment project. In August, Koch pulled out of agreement with the state over which developer to choose for the Times Square Mart project. In October, Koch and Governor Cuomo agreed on the Times Square Mart project by using a developer consortium. Credit was given to Sturz and William Stern of the state's Urban Development Corporation for resolving the dispute. In November, Sturz supported Trammell Crow as one of the lead developers for the Times Square Mart. In December, Sturz was optimistic about Times Square development and said Eighth Ave. development would increase as a result.
- In July, Koch announced a study about requiring developers of Manhattan office buildings and luxury apartments to contribute to a fund for housing in lower-income neighborhoods throughout the city. Sturz says: "This is one of the most significant conceptual issues facing city planning and the city itself. Manhattan isn't an island unto itself - it's part of the five boroughs and it is incumbent upon government to explore broader ramifications of zoning to see if it is not possible to help the entire city."
- In July, NYU urged approval of new law library. Sturz promised swift consideration.
- In August, the Planning Commission insisted a developer complete lower levels of project before opening top floors. The requirement was contested in court. In December, an agreement was reached out of court where the developer agreed to pay the city $750,000 in damages and formally apologize for zoning violations.
- In September, Koch proposed changing the mix of residents in Coney Island housing projects to include more working people, and turned the issue over to the Planning Commission.
- In October, conflicts of interest surfaced between developers, conservancy groups, and the Planning Commission, where developers sued to avoid prior assurances.
- In November, the developer for Hanover Square in lower Manhattan was required to submit a new application for changes and forego tax breaks in the current year.
- In December, it was announced that development proposals would be sought for a project along the Hudson River to complement the new Convention Center.

=== 1984 ===
- In January, Sturz opposed side street zoning variances.
- In January, numerous opinions surfaced on improving Shea Stadium. A study was commissioned by the state.
- In February, Sturz was placed on a panel to study New York's 16-year growth direction.
- In April, Sturz wrote a New York Times Opinion about the Pathmark parking lot. He explained the project's delay was due to the developer's extended failure to submit proper documentation.
- In April, planning for the city's waterfront was addressed in a conference. To enhance waterfront planning, Sturz hired an expert.
- In May, the Planning Commission began review of a tower project next to City Center of Music and Drama.
- In May, a letter opposing gentrification of E. 96th Street was sent to Sturz.
- In May, AT&T notified the Planning Commission that it would drop the museum from its development plan due to court-ordered divestures. Sturz anticipated a smooth resolution. In July, AT&T announced it would build an exhibition space instead. In August, AT&T said it would keep its original plan to build a public museum in its annex.
- In June, concerns were expressed about how the Times Square project would impact garment district manufacturing.
- In July, Sturz credited Benjamin Duke Holloway for an important supportive role in the Times Square project.
- In July, Sturz cast doubt on a 130 floor development at Columbus Circle.
- In July, preliminary development bids were solicited for the South Ferry Terminal along the East River.
- In August, City Planning proposed zoning changes around the new Convention Center to encourage further development.
- In August, a commission final report recommended spending tens of millions of additional dollars each year to create low- and moderate-income housing. It was sent to City Planning for final review.
- In October, Sturz sharply rebuked a developer who lost out on the Times Square project: "With assertions that are stale by as much as two and a half years, Mr. Milstein appears to be attempting to derail by innuendo and inaccuracy a process he did not win by merit."
- In October, Sturz urged zoning reform to give developers "a greater degree of predictability and certainty for their projects."
- In November, complaints and litigation still surrounded the Times Square project, which Sturz described as a natural outcome of the "democratic dialectic". In November, a group called on the Board of Estimate to delay their vote on Times Square. In November, Koch and Cuomo pledged additional spending in Clinton (near the Times Square development project) "to help insure the long-term vitality and stability of Clinton." Then, in November, the Board of Estimate unanimously approved the plan to rebuild Times Square. In November, a candidate to run the Times Square project is identified as Michael Blumenfeld.
- In December, Donald J. Trump proposed a unique way to finance an NFL football stadium in Queens. Cuomo said he wanted to bring an NFL team to NYC and was open to Trump's proposal but was concerned about how much it would cost the state. Koch was critical, saying: it "would make it difficult for the average New Yorker to see a game at the stadium."

=== 1985 ===
- In January, a Federal judge dismissed a lawsuit against the Times Square project.
- In March, Sturz strongly opposed a zoning variance for two Third Avenue projects being developed by Milstein Properties.
- In March, Sturz reiterated City Planning's commitment to "put development along the avenues where it ought to be rather than in the midblocks."
- In April, Cuomo and Koch set requirements for a new domed football stadium in Queens. City Planning will launch a nationwide bidding process. Cuomo and Koch say Trump's plan would need to provide a substantial number of seats for sale to the public per event.
- In April, City Planning requested bids for a Staten Island shopping center.
- In April, soaring real estate prices and other dynamics were predicted to increase costs for the Times Square project.
- In May, Koch and City Planning proposed zoning changes to encourage construction of apartments at about 75% of the current cost. The new zones would expedite the approval process.
- In June, Sturz supported additional bulk for Park Tower Realty office building in Wall Street.
- In June, a developer agreed to invest $4.3 million to renovate part of the East River esplanade because of prior unapproved modifications.
- In June, a pilot's union objected to the new Queens stadium plan. Sturz said they were following FAA regulations.
- In June, the Board of Estimate approved Sturz's request for funding to conduct environmental reviews for zoning changes.
- In August, Sturz said city growth was mostly driven by immigrants.
- In September, City Center Tower won final approvals from all city agencies. Sturz was credited for assisting the project to achieving multiple objectives to benefit the city and the arts.
- In October, the Planning Commission approved a Brooklyn Heights office building immediately after the developer and community groups agreed to its design.
- In November, the Planning Commission heard concerns about development plans in East New York.
- In December, Sturz said a new development proposal for the West Side waterfront requiring landfill would probably be a problem.
- In December, Trump was authorized to build the Queens sports stadium next to Shea, but only if he attracted an NFL team to play there. Trump claimed there would be no difficulty doing so.
- In December, Citicorp proposed a large office building complex in Queens. Sturz credited the project with helping to create jobs in the outer boroughs.
- In December, a member of the Planning Commission was not reappointed.
- In December, a study of a light rail line for the West Side was initiated by the Planning Commission.

=== 1986 ===
- In January, Sturz said city planners "want to bring fantasy back to Times Square and replace much of the grim reality that currently exists."
- In January, city planning considered a request for a commuter rail station and more than 1,000 additional parking spaces at Yankee Stadium.
- In February, city and state efforts to bring the Jets to New York were rejected by Leon Hess, the Jets' owner. He said Trump's plan would make season tickets too expensive.
- In March, Sturz's city salary was listed as $82,000 ($242,400 in 2025 dollars).
- In March, City Planning announced a light rail study for the far West Side.
- In March, a developer for the Times Square project, Michael J. Lazar, was indicted on racketeering and mail fraud.
- In March, City Planning considered asking developers to increase payments to cover rising land acquisition costs.
- In May, the state's top court unanimously upheld the Times Square redevelopment plan and dismissed six legal challenges.
- In May, Sturz continued to resist midblock upzoning.
- In June, a member of City Planning resigned due to a state and Federal corruption investigation. Sturz reluctantly accepted the resignation.
- In June, City Planning considered affordable housing projects for moderate- to middle-income people in the Bronx.
- In June, Sturz was interviewed on a wide variety of residential and commercial development topics.
- In July, two major tower projects were approved by City Planning: a twin-towered addition to Lincoln Center and a 43-story Citicorp building in Queens.
- In August, Sturz supported legislation requiring bright and extensive Times Square lighting, called the "Great White Way."
- In August, a developer agreed to build a two-block riverfront esplanade to expand East River public access.
- In September, Sturz's City Planning lawyer denied Sturz assured Penn Central or First Boston that a zoning dispute would be resolved in their favor.
- In October, the New York Times announced that Jack Rosenthal was the new Editorial Page editor, replacing Max Frankel, who became the new executive editor. Sturz announced he would be leaving City Planning to join the New York Times Editorial Board. In a press conference, Koch acknowledged Sturz's "brilliant" contributions and said: "He'll leave his imprint on this city for generations to come, on the physical landscape of this city." In an interview, Sturz listed his major accomplishments and disappointments while working for the city.
- In November, City Planning was credited for the surge in Times Square development.
- In November, Sturz said the Landmarks panel should remain independent rather than be part of City Planning.
- In November, Sturz said parks should be open to the public, not locked, as proposed in Clinton.
- In January, Sturz was replaced at City Planning by Sylvia Deutsch, who previously headed the city's Board of Standards and Appeals. Koch said her top priority would be low-, moderate- and middle-income housing in the city.

== New York Times Editorial Board (1987–1988) ==
At the start of 1987 (at age 56), Sturz joined the New York Times Editorial Board. He wrote opinions about national and local governmental and social issues. He worked with two of his best friends, Jack Rosenthal and Michael M. Weinstein. Rosenthal wrote and edited editorials at the Times for 16 years and won a Pulitzer in 1982 for distinguished editorial writing. Weinstein was a member of the Times Editorial board and economics columnist with over 180 contributions in the Times. During his two years at the Times, Sturz wrote 13 "Editorial Notebook" pieces and left at the end of 1988.

=== 1987 ===
- June: "Guards for Non-Inmates: Officers Can Serve In a Surprising Way"
- July: "Me I Am!"
- August: "A Friendly Place for Books; How to Sell Reading In East Harlem"
- August: "The Vacation Plague"
- September: "Sold!; For a Sensible Couple, Luxury Wheels"
- November: "'Sidney Is Trying'"
- December: "The Fire Tender and the Hungry"

=== 1988 ===
- February: "At Home With Lyme Disease"
- February: "A Safety Valve for Violent Schools"
- April: "A Sure Thing in the Casino"
- June: "In the Light of 'Urban Blight'"
- July: "What's Happening at International High?"
- August: "A Planner Faces Reality"

== Dreyfus and Trotwood (1989) ==
Sturz left the Times in late 1988 (age 57) to direct real-estate investment at the Dreyfus Corporation, an innovator in the mutual fund industry. Dreyfus was led by Howard M. Stein, who joined Dreyfus as an analyst in 1955, within ten years became its president, and in another five years its chairman and CEO. Sturz wanted to develop affordable housing along the East River in Hunters Point, Queens. The riverfront land was derelict but had a great view of Manhattan. Stein formed Trotwood Corporation (named after Sturz's dog) as a community real estate development subsidiary of Dreyfus and hired Sturz to run it.

An investor coalition was needed for the large Hunters Point project. A partnership called M.O. (Manhattan Overlook) Associates was formed with Sturz as general partner. Its investors included Trotwood, James D. Wolfensohn investment banking, Zeckendorf Company, and two Japanese construction and real estate companies, Tekken and Tobishima. The partnership purchased control of 10.5 acres in Hunters Point called the Gateway Residential Area of Queens West. In 1992, two public sponsors announced the possible project and highlighted the opportunity to keep union and other middle-class workers in the area. Sturz said: "We're looking at a limited-profit potential. We want to be part of something where we're making the statement that you can build in New York, reach a middle-income population and keep the union members who are here working."

Sturz assembled a unique mortgage insurance and financing arrangement with the Federal Housing Administration (FHA) to assist lower-income and first-time home buyers. The innovative "low-equity" financing strategy created a "bridge to homeownership for cash-poor families in high-cost markets" according to Nick Retsinas, head of the FHA. Deputy Mayor for economic planning and development Fran Reiter said: "Projects this exciting and of this scale only come along a handful of times each century."

Construction first started on a public park in September 1994. The first residential building had 42 stories and was called Citylights at Queens Landing. By the end of 1996, 521 Citylights units were for sale, had an applicant waiting list of 4,000, and was scheduled to open in the fall of 1997. By November 1997, 44% of the apartments had been sold, about 19% were occupied, and 13% had been set aside for families with incomes below $57,000 ($115,100 in 2025).

Dreyfus and Trotman were acquired by Mellon Financial in 1994. In March 1998, Mellon sold its financial interests in Queens West to Tishman Speyer. Sturz continued with the project, but World-Wide Holdings Corporation and James Wolfensohn dropped out. Construction on the second building was expected to start in the fall of 1998.

== Midtown Community Court (1993) ==
In 1993 (at age 62), Sturz tackled another Times Square issue: misdemeanor crime growth. While working full time at Trotwood, Sturz had breakfast with Gerald Schoenfeld, chairman of the Shubert Organization. Schoenfield complained bitterly about crime in the Manhattan theater district and its negative impact on tourist revenue. Sturz recommended an experiment: community court. Schoenfield liked the idea, so Sturz gathered support within the criminal justice system and helped secure private and public funding. Sturz hired its founding director, John Feinblatt, and its fist planning director, Amanda Burden.

The court would handle "all misdemeanor arrests in midtown Manhattan, including so-called 'quality-of-life' crimes like vandalism, fare-beating, prostitution and drug possession." The court's supporters included residents and business leaders, Mayor David N. Dinkins, and top city and state judges. The hope was to reduce crime, save court time and money, and offer alternative sentences and treatments that helped offenders and the community.

A thorough study of the experiment was completed in 1997. It concluded that many of the court's goals were met, especially with restoring community confidence in the criminal justice system. "Since the 1993 opening of New York City's Midtown Community Court, dozens of cities have created their own community courts."

== Open Society Institute (1993–2019) ==
George Soros founded Open Society Institute (OSI) in 1979. Its philanthropic work began with scholarships for Black South African students during apartheid and for dissidents in communist Eastern Europe to study in the West. Sturz started working with Soros and OSI in 1993 (age 62). After serving on OSI's board for 12 years, Sturz became a senior advisor, and then contributed on a pro-bono basis starting in 2019 (at age 88). Overall, Sturz worked with Open Society for over two and a half decades.

=== NURCHA (1994) ===
In February 1994, Sturz was asked by Aryeh Neier (then president of OSI) and Soros to help improve housing in post-apartheid South Africa. It was anticipated that innovative financing similar to what Sturz created for Citylights would be needed. In 1995, the National Urban and Reconstruction and Housing Agency (NURCHA) was created as a joint venture between the South African Government and the Soros Economic Development Fund (SEDF). Both groups contributed $5 million for operating expenses. The effort had a slow start due to South African banking resistance. Then Soros pledged $50 million ($106 million in 2025 dollars) in loan guarantees, conditional to an additional $250 million being raised across the world from other contributors. By 2001, NURCHA had built 70,000 homes and by 2007 had built 200,000 homes. Almost all of the loans to builders, who were black South Africans, were repaid. After more than two decades, NURCHA was still operating and it is 100% managed by the state of South Africa.

=== The After School Corporation (1998) ===
In 1998, the director of OSIs US programs, Gara LaMarche, asked Sturz about social justice needs in NYC. Sturz proposed the creation of an after school program. The After-School Corporation (TASC) was founded in 1998 and Sturz was its first board chairman. OSI offered a five-year, $125 million challenge grant, where additional funds had to be raised on a three-to-one basis. OSI extended the grant for two additional years in 2001. TASC "was the first organization that set out to build a citywide system of daily comprehensive afterschool programs for kids in kindergarten through high school." "Since its founding in 1998, TASC has helped 464,000 kids and has trained 21,000 community educators. It has also supported 528 public schools in extending learning beyond 3 PM. TASC has helped 369 community organizations and cultural institutions and colleges build partnerships with schools and communities."

=== Afterschool Alliance (2000) ===
In 2000, Open Society joined with other philanthropies to create a national effort, Afterschool Alliance, "to expand afterschool and summer learning opportunities nationwide. Since our inception, public investment in afterschool programs has doubled." The Alliance involves mayors, police chiefs, prosecutors, social service agencies, and major corporations.

=== The Center for New York City Neighborhoods (2007) ===
In 2007 (at age 76), Soros recommended that Sturz find a way to help victims of the subprime mortgage crisis through counseling and legal services. Soros committed $10 million over two years to support the effort, and The Center for New York City Neighborhoods was established, with Sturz as its chairman. By 2008, The Center had built a network of 27 community-based organizations and was the largest independent non-profit organization in the country devoted to helping homeowners at risk of foreclosure. In 2010, The Center started direct involvement in mortgage holder negotiations with lenders. In 2017 it was protecting and promoting affordable homeownership.

== ReServe (2005) ==
Sturz's good friend Jack Rosenthal had the idea of tapping the rapidly growing population of retirees by helping them serve nonprofit and public agencies. Rosenthal founded ReServe and asked Sturz to be its vice-chairman. Initial funding came from John A. Griffin through his Blue Ridge Foundation. By 2008, ReServe had placed 450 people with 110 nonprofit agencies. Later, Sturz's and Rosenthal's friend Michael Weinstein joined the ReServe board. ReServe joined FedCap in 2013.

== Single Stop (2007) ==
Michael Weinstein, long-time close friend with Sturz, asked for help. As chief program officer for Robin Hood Foundation in 2007, Weinstein wanted to create Single Stop, a program for expediting the process of getting eligible funds distributed to inmates and their families upon release. Sturz interviewed inmates and their families to get a better sense of their needs and how to help them. Sturz helped convert Single Stop into a separate nonprofit agency. In 2017 Single Stop joined The Fedcap Group. As of 2025, Single Stop had helped 1.9 million households recover $6 billion in benefits.

== Independent Rikers (Lippman) Commission (2016) ==
The Independent Rikers Commission (also referred to as the Lippman Commission) was formed in February 2016 by the New York City Council, with Melissa Mark-Viverito as speaker. The city council appointed Jonathan Lippman, the newly retired New York State Court of Appeals chief judge, as its chairman. Its mission was to comprehensively examine the city's criminal justice system and find ways to close the notorious yet still active Rikers Island jail complex.

According to Lippman, Sturz laid the groundwork for the Commission in December 2015 and January 2016 by taking Lippman to speak with NYC mayor Bill de Blasio and many others inside and outside of city government. In February, Lippman was called by Mark-Viverito, who asked him to head the commission. From there, Lippman spoke with Sturz on a daily basis on who should be members and how to fund the Commission.

Sturz served as one of the initial 27 commission members. He served with people he knew well, including Nicholas R. Turner (Vera), Darren Walker (Ford Foundation), and Kenneth Zimmerman (Open Society Foundations). The Commission's first report was released in 2017 and immediately gained support from Mayor Bill de Blasio. As of 2025, the Commission still honors Sturz as a past member.

== Personal life and death ==
In 1954, Sturz met Elizabeth Lyttleton, a folklorist, writer, and poet. When they met, Lyttleton had a nine-year-old daughter, Anna Lomax, and was divorced from Alan Lomax. Sturz and Lyttleton married in 1958 and remained together for 52 years until her death in 2010.

In 2012, Sturz married Margaret L. Shaw, Esq. She was a lawyer, civil litigator, and pioneer in alternative dispute resolution (ADR). Sturz and Shaw remained married until her death in 2017.

Sturz moved to Tucson, Arizona in 2021 for assisted living and to receive daily care from two nieces, Ratna Jennifer Sturz and Lisa Aimee Sturz. He died shortly after from congestive heart failure at the age of 90.

== Tributes ==
The first book about Sturz was published in 2009 by Sam Roberts. It was deeply grounded in interviews with Sturz, his dear friends, and people who worked closely with him. That same year, Herb and Elizabeth Sturz received the "Stepping Up" award from the New York Women's Foundation. In 2017, a tribute to Sturz was published by Vera Institute of Justice. It contained contributions from 74 people who knew and worked with Sturz. In 2019, Open Society Foundations published a tribute about Sturz by Aryeh Neier.

When Sturz died on June 10, 2021, there was an immediate outpouring of gratitude for his life of public service.

Date	Organization	Title	Link
Jun 11, 2021	The New York Times	Herb Sturz, a Quiet Force in the Life of New York City, Dies at 90	
Jun 14, 2021	The Fedcap Group	A Tribute to Herb Sturz: December 31, 1930 — June 10, 2021	
Jun 14, 2021	The Fedcap Group	Remembering Herb Sturz – Our Colleague, Friend and Champion	
Jun 14, 2021	The Fedcap Group	My Friend Herb Sturz	
Jun 14, 2021	The Fedcap Group	Video: Remembering Herb Sturz – Our Colleague, Friend and Champion	
Jun 11, 2021	Vera Institute of Justice	"There Is No Other Like You": Remembering Herb Sturz	
Dec 2021	Vera Institute of Justice	In Memoriam: Herb Sturz, A Modest Giant Among Advocates	
Jun 11, 2021	George Soros	"I mourn the passing of Herb Sturz, a great friend and wonderful person who had an enormous impact on the work of criminal justice reform and open society."	
Jun 16, 2021	Open Society Foundations	The Legacy of Herb Sturz: Solving Society's Toughest Problems (recording from March 19, 2009)	
Jun 28, 2021	New York Association of Pretrial Service Agencies (NYAPSA)	Herb Sturz, the Man Primarily Responsible for the Start of Pretrial Services, Passed Away on June 12, 2021 at 90.	
Jun 11, 2021	Center for Justice Innovation	Herb Sturz, Influential Justice Reformer, Leaves a Lasting Legacy	
Jun 14, 2021	CASES	Honoring Herb Sturz and Michael Smith	
Jun 16, 2021	Legal Action Center	Remembering Herb Sturz, Legal Action Center Co-Founder and Trailblazing Health & Justice Advocate	
Sep 10, 2021	Afterschool Alliance	Remembering Herb Sturz	
Jun 2021	Jonathan Lippman and Greg Berman	Remembering Herb Sturz: Pioneering Social Entrepreneur	
Jun 12, 2021	Greenburger Center for Justice	Herb Sturz: Come Hell or High Water	
Jun 11, 2021	Jewish Telegraphic Agency	Herb Sturz, driver of criminal justice reform in New York City and beyond, dies at 90	
Jun 10, 2021	Daily News	'He was a New York landmark, a treasure': Vera Institute founder and criminal justice reformer Herbert Sturz dead at 90	
