= Louis Schweitzer (disambiguation) =

Louis Schweitzer (1942–2025) was a French businessman and the chairman and CEO of Renault.

Louis Schweitzer or Louis Schwitzer may also refer to:

- Louis Schweitzer (philanthropist) (1899–1971), paper industrialist and philanthropist, donated WBAI to Pacifica Radio
- Louis Schwitzer (1880–1967), American engineer and racing driver
- Louis Schwitzer Award, an engineering award
