= Presentence investigation report =

Legal term

A presentence investigation report (PSIR) is a legal document that presents the findings of an investigation into the "legal and social background" of a person convicted of a crime before sentencing to determine if there are extenuating circumstances which should influence the severity or leniency of a criminal sentence. The PSIR is a "critical" document prepared by a probation officer via a system of point allocation, so that it may serve as a charging document and exhibit for proving criminal conduct. The PSIR system is widely implemented today.

== History ==
PSIR reports trace their origins to the efforts of prison reformer John Augustus who in the 1840s began a campaign to allow discretion in sentencing to help those who were deemed undeserving of harsh sentences and could be reformed. More specifically, in the Police Court of Boston, Augustus posted bail for a man, promising the judge that the man would improve upon returning to the court and would earn a lessened sentence. The rationale behind this was that if a person was not a dangerous criminal, i.e. convicted murderer or other violent offender, that they should be allowed to have familial support, continue working, as well a receive aid from trained specialists, without being in prison. The practice then became firmly entrenched in the 1920s under a theory that crime was a pathology that could be diagnosed and treated like a disease; PSIRs were meant to expose the main reasons behind criminal acts by looking at the offenders history in light of forgiveness and understanding, and thus resulting in a positive change for the future. Since the 1970s, the focus of these documents has increasingly shifted to profiling the defendant's criminal history, with a decreasing emphasis on the defendant's social background. This is at least partially attributable to the increase in public fear of crime since the 1970s as well as the increasing opposition to more "liberal" approaches to the matter of criminal justice.

The information included in a typical PSIR encompasses both legal and extralegal information about the defendant such as:

Legal Information

- Juvenile record
- Adult record
- Previous court record
- Probation/parole history
- Mitigating and aggravating circumstances
- Official version of offense
- Plea bargain
- Custody status
- Pending cases
- Previous cases
- Recommendation summary

Extralegal Information

- Probation officer recommendations
- Gang affiliation
- Background and ties to the community
- Substance use disorder history
- Physical health
- Mental health
- Financial circumstances
- Employment history
- Education history
- Medical history
- Victim-impact statement
- Marital history
- Military record
- Evaluative/needs summary

There is considerably more extralegal information contained within the PSIR. This is important because many have seen this as suggestive of sentencing disparities or inequality in the treatment of offenders with a lower socioeconomic status or little to few ties to the community. However, as Alarid and Montemayor (2010, p. 130) state, "The use of extralegal factors becomes especially important in that the PSIR identifies needs related to the defendant's criminal behavior for future treatment intervention services".

== Purpose ==
The report has an immediate purpose: to help the court determine an appropriate sentence as well as aide in officer sentencing recommendations. The report serves to collect objective, relevant, and factual information on a specific defendant. Since the advent of the sentencing guidelines, the importance of the presentence reports has increased. This is because the document is now designed to frame factual and legal issues for sentencing. Thereafter, if a defendant is incarcerated, the Bureau of Prisons or State Department of Corrections will use information in the report to designate the institution where the offender will serve the sentence and determine the offender's eligibility or need for specific correctional programs. Also, depending on the jurisdiction, the presentence report can be used to calculate the release date. The probation officer assigned responsibility for the offender's case during probation and supervised release will use the report to make an initial assessment of case needs and risks. Additionally, the report may be used as a source of information for future research. The information allows changing of a sentence subject to the Commitment Order and the judge's verdict. This report is considered "the critical document at both the sentencing and the correction stages" of the criminal justice system.

== Preparation ==
Whether interviewing or reviewing documents, the probation officer must weigh the evidence based on the best available information. The final report must contain only accurate information. The goal is to produce a report that the court may rely upon at sentencing. Though it is inevitable that there will be data that the probation officer is unable to verify, that information should be clearly identified. The probation officer must distinguish between facts and the inferences, opinions, or conclusions based upon those facts.

When a defendant is referred for a presentence investigation, the officer must immediately begin to gather the facts. Though the procedure varies slightly from jurisdiction to jurisdiction, the officer usually conducts several aspects of the investigation concurrently to ensure that the presentence report is submitted to the court on time. Since officers routinely conduct multiple presentence investigations simultaneously, meeting the deadlines can be difficult.

=== Review of records ===
During any investigation a probation officer may review numerous documents including: court dockets, plea agreements, investigative reports from numerous agencies, previous probation or parole records, pretrial services records, medical records, counseling and substance use disorder treatment records, scholastic records, employment records, financial records, and others. The probation officer must study and review each document received and determine the likely accuracy of the record.

The probation officer's investigation of the offense usually begins with an examination of the complaint, information, or indictment charging the defendant and the docket describing the judicial history of the case. These documents may be found in the district court clerk's file. The officer will use them to develop a brief chronological history of the prosecution of the case and identify the specific charges that resulted in the conviction. The review of the clerk's file may also reveal the identities of co-defendants or related cases, the status of which must be investigated and reported in the presentence report. At the same time, the probation officer may also request information about the offender's history, circumstances, and release status from the pretrial services officer or from a separate pretrial services agency.

Before interviewing the defendant about the offense, the probation officer must review official descriptions of the offense conduct and the applicable guidelines. As a result, it is often necessary to postpone a discussion of the offense until a second interview. The offender is also asked to submit a written statement about the offense conduct.

Additionally, the probation officer must make an inquiry into the offender's criminal history. This is usually accomplished by using databases maintained by the Federal Bureau of Investigation (FBI), the National Crime Information Center (NCIC), or state law enforcement agencies. Though the guideline criminal history category is based only upon sentences imposed for juvenile adjudications and criminal convictions meeting specific criteria, the probation officer reports all known incidents in which the defendant has been involved in criminal behavior to partially fulfill the statutory mandate to provide information to the court regarding the history and characteristics of the defendant. The early examination of computerized criminal history records enables the officer to identify which law enforcement, court, and correctional records must be reviewed. In addition, the initial interview of the defendant should include questioning about the offender's residential history so that the officer can check local police and court records in every jurisdiction where the defendant has lived. Additionally, the probation officer may request physical and mental health, educational, employment or financial records from a variety of sources to corroborate information provided by the offender.

=== Interview of defendant ===
Probation officers investigate by interviewing and reviewing documents. Unless the defendant declines, the defendant is questioned in every case. Additionally, the officer should interview the defense counsel, the prosecutor, law enforcement agents who investigated the conduct that led to the defendant's conviction, victims, the defendant's family, present or previous employers, school officials, doctors, counselors, and others. The diverse interview settings that probation officers encounter require them to be proficient in a variety of questioning techniques.

Ideally, the offender is available for the interview early in the investigation. The defendant interview is the pivotal point around which the presentence investigation turns. Often, the format is a structured interview during which a standard worksheet is completed. The worksheet follows the format of the presentence report and provides space for recording data about the offense and the offender's characteristics and history. Each item on the form is reviewed with the defendant. Even though some of the data solicited from the offender during this interview may not appear in the final report, it is impossible at this stage to determine what information will be included. No question is asked without a purpose. The defendant's answers will determine follow up questions, items for further investigation or corroboration, and, ultimately, whether the data should be included in the report.

The presentence investigation is often the first inquiry into the offender's past, and the initial interview provides the framework for the report's description of the offender's history and circumstances. The probation officer inquires about the defendant's family and developmental history, familial and marital relationships, education, employment history, physical and mental health, alcohol or controlled substance abuse, and finances. The emphasis throughout the questioning is on identifying information that is relevant for understanding the defendant's offense conduct and present situation. During the interview, the probation officer will ask the offender to sign authorizations to release confidential information. At the conclusion of the initial interview, the offender may be asked to provide numerous documents to the probation officer substantiating the offender's complete life history. Additionally, the offender may be asked to submit an autobiography.

If the defendant impedes the probation officer's investigation, e.g. by failing to disclose all prior convictions and arrests, his sentence may be increased for obstruction of justice and failure to accept responsibility, even if the undisclosed information has no effect on his criminal history score. Since some defendants may not remember all such prior history, some defense attorneys conduct their own investigations. Some courts have ruled that a defendant waives his Fifth Amendment right against self-incrimination when he pleads guilty. It remains to be seen exactly how this applies to presentence investigation interviews, but it appears likely that a defendant who refuses to talk about his criminal history will jeopardize his sentence reduction for acceptance of responsibility.

=== Gathering of information from other persons ===
Another step that must occur early in the investigation is contact prosecutor assigned to the case. The prosecutor will be asked to provide information about the conduct that resulted in the defendant's conviction, victim's losses, the defendant's history, and any other data relevant to the sentencing decision. Recently, the amount of time PSI's spend on personal background information has decreased in favor of facts concerning the criminal act. During the investigation, the defense counsel will also be asked to discuss the same topics.

After the interview of the offender, contact with the prosecutor, and the criminal history inquiry, the probation officer must identify any information gaps, must identify potential sources for the missing information, and must plan on how to eliminate the gaps. It may be necessary for the investigating officer to request another probation officer in another jurisdiction to conduct a collateral investigation about a specific aspect of the case. Supplemental interviews may be scheduled with case agents, victims, family members, employers, counselors, or others.

=== Writing and revision ===
Gradually, the emphasis shifts from gathering information to analyzing data. The probation officer must take the tentative findings of fact regarding the offense conduct and criminal history and must make tentative applications of the sentencing guidelines. The applicable sentencing options that the probation officer must recite in the presentence report. Additionally, the probation officer must study the case to identify potential grounds for departure from the guidelines and then must analyze any potential departure to determine if it is valid. During the investigation, the probation officer may consult a probation officer specialist who is a subject matter expert about guidelines, financial investigation, mental health, substance abuse, or some other aspect of the case. The probation officer may also consult a supervisor or, in a team environment, other members of the officer's team.

Finally, the probation officer must write a draft of the report for disclosure to the defendant and the attorneys. When objections to report are received, the probation officer must manage the resolution of disputes. The officer must be impartial and open to opposing perspective and must consider all relevant and reliable information before making an independent judgment about the tentative findings of fact and guideline applications that will be recommended to the court. The probation officer must be prepared to report unresolved disputes to the court in a detached, dispassionate manner focusing on the factual or legal disagreement among the parties.

After revising the report in response to objections, the probation officer develops a sentencing recommendation based on the facts and sentencing options identified in the report. The written justification for the recommendation is the probation officer's evaluation and analysis of the offense, the offender, and the sentencing options. The justification provides the officer's rationale for the specific sentencing recommendations. It should address the statutory factors to be considered in imposing a sentence and should assist the court in the preparation of the judge's statement of reasons for imposing a sentence.

The officer then discloses the final report and sentencing recommendation to court through a mathematical system of allocating points. The total number of points allocated in each case lets the judge know what the presumptive sentence is. The officer also discloses the report to the defendant, and both attorneys. The probation officer must then be prepared to discuss the case with the sentencing judge in chambers or in court, to answer questions about the report that arise during the sentencing hearing, and, ultimately, to testify under oath in open court as to the basis for the factual findings and guideline applications recommended in the report.

In the Federal System, after the offender's sentencing by the Court, the probation officer must ensure that copies of the pre-sentence report and other requested documents are forwarded to the U.S. Bureau of Prisons and the U.S. Sentencing Commission. If possible, the probation officer must also interview the offender after sentencing and instruct the defendant about the conditions of supervision that the court imposed. A written copy of the conditions of supervision must be provided to each offender.

== Rules ==
Rule 32 of the Federal Rules of Criminal Procedure and §6A1.1 of the United States Federal Sentencing Guidelines regulate presentence reports.

The report must be disclosed to the court, the defendant, defendant's counsel, and the attorney for the government at least 35 days before the sentencing. Local rules, adopted by the judges of each jurisdiction, supplement the federal rules and set a specific schedule for the disclosure of the initial draft of the presentence report to the defendant and both counsel. The schedule for the filing of objections to the report by counsel and the submission of the final report to the court, the defendant, and counsel may be set, as well.

The probation officer must manage the investigation process within the time line established by those rules. In addition to gathering information, the officer must plan to verify that information, interpret and evaluate the data, determine the appropriate sentencing guidelines and statutes to the specific facts of the case, and present the results of the investigation in an organized and objective report. The probation officer must set deadlines for the submission of information by the defendant and others and monitor compliance with the deadlines.

== Limitations ==
One major point of criticism lies in the lack of objectivity inherent to PEIs as a genre. As the author, the probation officer is expected to report only factual information, which can result in an exclusion of background information regarding the defendant, ultimately impacting the perception of the accused and potentially the subsequent sentencing.

The document has recently undergone several structural changes to become more of an unbiased law enforcement tool, and less of a broad overview of the defendant and their circumstances. The goal of these changes has been to enforce a strict adherence to simply reporting facts. Unfortunately, this may have only changed the appearance of any subjective judgement made on the defendant, without actually removing bias.

== See also ==
- Pretrial services report
