= Elizabeth Lyttleton Sturz =

American poet, writer, folklorist, and social worker

- Born: Elizabeth Harold; May 9, 1917; Blanco County, Texas, US
- Died: October 21, 2010 (aged 93); New York City, US
- Other names: Elizabeth Lyttleton; Elizabeth Lomax
- Education: University of Texas at Austin; George Washington University
- Alma mater: Empire State University
- Occupations: Social service founder and innovator, author, folklorist
- Organization: Argus Community (founder and president)
- Spouses: Alan Lomax (1937–1950); Herb Sturz (1958)
- Children: 2, including Anna Lomax Wood

Elizabeth Lyttleton Sturz (née Elizabeth Harold, also Elizabeth Lomax; May 9, 1917 – October 21, 2010) was an American author, folklorist, and social service founder and innovator. She recorded and interviewed musicians across America with Alan Lomax. She wrote "ballad-operas," or plays for radio. She wrote poems and two books. And, Sturz was the founder and president of Argus Community.

== Early life ==
Sturz was born on May 9, 1917, in Blanco, Texas, as Elizabeth Harold. Her father, Michael Harold Sr., a lawyer, was also born in Blanco. Michael graduated from Texas State University and played football there. Sturz's mother was Elizabeth Rice Lyttleton, a housewife born in Louisa, Kentucky. Sturz's parents married in 1913, they had a son Michael Jr. in 1914. They were 31 years old when Sturz was born in 1917. In late 1916, Michael was a law partner with his father-in-law, Judge Henry Thomas Lyttleton.

Sometime in 1917 or 1918, Michael Harold Sr. had surgery for a mental disorder and recovered in a sanitarium. After his release, he enlisted in World War I and moved his wife and two children in August 1918 to the Camp Taylor military base near Louisville, Kentucky. The war ended later that year, and Michael was honorably discharged. The family returned to Blanco, and in February 1919, Michael murdered his brother Robert. The murder was attributed to the recurrence of his mental disorder. By 1920, Michael was institutionalized in a state asylum in Austin, Texas. In 1930, Michael was a schizophrenia patient in an Arkansas VA hospital, and he died there in 1957.

After the February 1919 murder, Sturz's mother was unemployed with two children and pregnant. The family moved to Beaumont, Texas and lived in the home of Eva (née Harold) Dujay (Sturz's mother's sister-in-law, married to Gilbert W. Dujay). Sturz's sister Anne was born a few months later.

By 1930 (age 13), Sturz lived in Dallas, Texas with her mother (now a law stenographer) and two siblings. Sturz attended Sunset High School from 1931 to 1933. Sturz's first daughter, Shelley Suzanne Goodman, was born in Dallas in 1934 when Sturz was age 17. The father was Howard Harris Goodman (age 21), and his parents adopted Shelley and raised her.

Sturz was a freshman at the University of Texas at Austin in 1936, when she met Alan Lomax, a senior, and son of John Lomax. Lomax graduated that year with a B.A. in philosophy, summa cum laude, and Phi Beta Kappa. They married the next year in Port-au-Prince, Haiti on February 16, 1937 (Elizabeth age 19, Alan age 22).

== Folklorist ==
Lomax (age 21) won a five-month grant from the Library of Congress in November 1936 to visit Haiti and record local, traditional music. He proposed to Sturz to marry him there and she accepted. After their marriage in Port-au-Prince in February 1937, Sturz and Lomax worked as a folklorist team. They documented music and rituals of: "Vodu, Mardi Gras, Catholicism, old French romance ballads, the work songs of the collective labor groups (the knobits), as well as folktales, children's game songs, bands of all sorts, jazz, and classical music". Their materials included: "350 feet of remarkably fine 8mm color motion picture film by Elizabeth Lomax that showed the making of drums, dances, work, domestic life, and religion". By the time they left Haiti for Washington D.C. in April 1937, they had more than 1,500 recordings.

The duo's next archiving trip for the Library of Congress was in September and October 1937. Most of their time was spent in Kentucky with a short stop in Ohio. The team's contract included an allowance of $5 a day for housing, food, and personal expenses. In addition, Lomax was paid an annual salary of $1,620 per year. During the Kentucky travels they recorded hundreds of songs, including several Christmas songs. These recordings represented most of the 847 items in the Lomax Kentucky Recordings collection. These recordings were later curated for teachers of Grades 3 through 12 by PBS.

In March 1938, Sturz and Lomax recorded in Indiana, focusing on Amish and Americana songs and English ballads. They also did further work in Ohio, where they met Pete Steele and recorded him for the first time. Their Indiana and Ohio recordings are in a section of the Lomax Kentucky Recordings collection.

In the fiscal year ending June 1938, the Library of Congress more than doubled its recordings compared to its previous ten years of content. This was primarily due to the efforts of Lomax and Sturz. In June the Library also increased Lomax's annual salary 11% to $1,800. Several months later they increased it to $2,600 (about $36,800 in 2025 dollars).

Starting in February 1939 Sturz and Lomax split their time between Fairfax and Greenwich Village. Woody Guthrie lived with Lomax and Sturz for a month in 1940 in Fairfax. During a three-day session, the team recorded 40 Woody Guthrie songs at the Department of Interior's studios, filling 17 discs. The recordings came to be known as the Library of Congress Recordings. In 1941, Sturz and Lomax traveled widely across the US for the LIbrary of Congress and a joint project with Fisk University. They interviewed and recorded numerous musicians, including Fiddling Joe Martin, Emmet Lundy, Willie Brown, Son House, Estil C. Ball, and Mckinley Morganfield, whose stage name was Muddy Waters. In 1942, Sturz and Lomax were recording Son House where he worked on a plantation in Mississippi. The plantation manager ordered them to follow him to the sheriff's office, where Sturz was jabbed in the kidney with a pistol.

In October 1942, Lomax followed his Library of Congress boss Archibald MacLeish to the Office of War Information (OWI), earning $3,800 annually ($75,500 in 2025 dollars). But Lomax was called for WWII military service in 1944, so he did not earn this salary for long.

During the 1950s, Sturz conducted lengthy interviews for Lomax with folk music personalities, including Vera Ward Hall and the Reverend Gary Davis. She also helped Lomax revise the Lead Belly book, which included an interview with his wife Martha Ledbetter.

== Author ==
In 1943, Sturz and Lomax rented an apartment in Gramercy Park. Sturz worked for the Office of the Coordinator of Inter-American Affairs, run by Nelson A. Rockefeller, and then for the OWI and the BBC Home Service as a script writer earning $3,600 ($67,400 in 2025 dollars). Sturz wrote three "ballad operas," a format innovated by Lomax in his prior work at the OWI. These productions combined folk singing with acting and storytelling. They were produced in the US and distributed through British radio networks, especially the BBC. This was part of the US WWII effort to lift morale of overseas troops and increase international support for fighting fascism.

- The Man Who Went to War. Written by Langston Hughes and produced by the BBC's Douglas Bridson in 1943. Sturz and Lomax selected the folk songs.
- The Martins and the Coys. Sturz wrote the script (as Elizabeth Lyttleton). It was published as a five-disc BBC Records Album in 1944 and included: acting and singing by Will Geer, Woody Guthrie (in his only documented acting role), Burl Ives, Lily May Ledford, Pete Seeger, Fiddlin’ Arthur Smith, and Hally Wood.
- The Chisholm Trail. Sturz (credited as Elizabeth Lyttleton Harold) wrote the script. It included performances by Woody Guthrie and Burl Ives, and was broadcast by the BBC in Britain in February 1945.

By November 1944, Sturz and Lomax were again living in the Village, and Sturz gave birth to their daughter, Anna Lyttleton Lomax. With Lomax now in the army, the family relied on Sturz's income, so she swiftly returned to work. With the end of WWII, the OWI was closed in September 1945 along with Sturz's employment there. Sturz continued as a script writer by adapting novels for radio, credited as Elizabeth Lomax:

- John Steinbeck's The Pastures of Heaven, 1946.
- Thomas Wolfe's Of Time and the River, 1947, for Radioteatro de America in two half-hour sequences.
- Thomas Wolfe's Look Homeward, Angel, retitled Farewell to Altamont, 1947, for Voice of America in 14 episodes. As reviewed in the New York Times in 1947: this gifted writer distilled Thomas Wolfe's "Look Homeward, Angel” verbosity into a half hour of lucid drama.

In 1950, Sturz wrote the libretto for O'Higgins of Chile by Henry Cowell (credited as Elizabeth Harald [Lomax]), but it was never performed.

In 1958 Sturz (as Elizabeth Lyttleton) published a book with Herb Sturz: Reapers of the Storm. Their research was conducted while living in Malaga, Spain for 14 months in 1955 to 1956. They told authorities they were working on a complimentary piece about the Franco regime. In fact, they intended to reveal the painful living conditions most people were experiencing then. They interviewed local fishermen and gave them small notebooks to use as diaries. The team smuggled their materials out of Spain to London in 1956 where they wrote their book. It was reviewed by Time magazine, which said the authors smuggled the book out of Spain into Gibraltar, and feared reprisal from Spanish agents even though they had moved to New Jersey.

A New York Times review said:

As a novel it stands on its own a somber, bitter and vivid painting of life as it is lived by millions of unhappy and frustrated Spaniards today. One gets a true sense of the grinding poverty, the religiosity mixed with hatred of the clergy, the petty cruelty and corruption of the officials and the few well-to-do. But there is also the dignity, patience and courage of the Spaniard who lives at the lowest economic and social level, and a majority do. The collaboration between the two authors (a husband and wife team) is so smoothly achieved that there is no possible way of detecting that a man and woman have written it together except for the dust jacket.

Sturz regularly wrote poems published in the Saturday Review of Literature, and she received a Rosenwald Foundation Fellowship award to write a novel. Sturz also made contributions to the New York Times as a book reviewer. For example, Sturz reviewed The Girls in the Gang in 1984.

Sturz's book Widening Circles was published in 1985. It was about the Argus Community, which Sturz founded and directed.

== Argus Community ==
In 1968, Sturz founded Argus Community, a community based organization (CBO). It started in the Melrose neighborhood of the South Bronx and worked with 130 to 145 teenage women at a time, 24 of whom were housed in one of two residential houses. Argus offered a safe environment for young women to learn and heal from abuse, neglect, or abandonment. Some clients were designated by the courts as PINS (persons in need of supervision).

In 1987, Sturz and co-author Mary Taylor reported that Argus had a 70 percent success rate. They used nine criteria to access performance, and at least one of them had to be achieved. It was noted that about one-third of Argus attendees were involved in the criminal justice system, and about one-third were brought to Argus by their parents. All were dropouts, and nearly all used drugs. The authors point out that: In 1987 Argus was selected by the Greater New York Fund as one of six best-managed social welfare agencies in New York.

From 1990 to 1997, Sturz sought, approved, and facilitated a $4.5 million research project at Argus that was funded by the National Institute on Drug Abuse (NIDA). The study was led by Michael Rahav and examined various approaches to the treatment of mentally ill chemical abusers. More than 50 publications resulted from this research.

As of 2025, Argus had served over 100,000 people across all 5 New York City boroughs, Long Island, and Westchester County. Ninety-five percent of its patients used addiction services, 90% used HIV treatments, and 87% used education services. One of its facilities is named the Elizabeth L. Sturz Outpatient Center, which is a medically supervised intensive outpatient substance abuse treatment program for adults and adolescents seeking recovery services.

Sturz explains she was encouraged to write Widening Circles by anthropologist Margaret Mead, whose graduate students conducted research at Argus. Sturz devoted the book "To my mother and all parents who have had to raise their children without proper tools and supportive networks", and described it as "a plea for more opportunities, more programs, more jobs for high-risk youth."

== Personal life, death, and legacy ==
Sturz gave birth to her first child, Shelley Suzanne Goodman, when she was 17 years old. Shelley was adopted by Howard Goodman's parents (Horace and Iola Goodman). Shelley graduated in 1952 from Highland Park High School in Dallas, Texas and was a member of the National Honor Society. Shelley married Volf Roitman, and they had a daughter Scarlett.

Starting in her mid- to late-20s, Sturz's professional career strengthened, primarily as an author for BBC radio broadcasts. During this time, Sturz gave birth to her second child, Anna Lomax Wood. She immediately returned to work after Anna's birth. Lomax's income was low and irregular at this time. His military pay was low, and his employment at the Library of Congress and his one-year Guggenheim Fellowship of 1946 had not been replaced with steady income. The concerts he produced with Pete Seeger and People's Songs lost money, including their concerts supporting Henry A. Wallace's unsuccessful 1948 presidential campaign. Lomax started psychoanalysis in 1947 and his father John died in 1948. Lomax was persistently investigated by the FBI, who repeatedly sought confirmation, unsuccessfully, amongst Lomax's friends and business associates that he was a member of the communist party. Lomax became involved with New York actress and folk singer Robin Roberts, whom he visited in Europe in September 1949. Sturz filed for divorce from Alan Lomax in Harris County, Texas in 1950 (age 33).

In 1952, Sturz and daughter Anna (age 8) met Lomax in Paris. The threesome traveled together for a while in France, and then Sturz and Anna returned to New York. Sturz and Anna returned to Paris to meet Lomax in March 1954 when Anna was 10 years old. From Paris they traveled to Italy, and Sturz and Anna settled in Positano. Lomax continued his travels and seldom saw his daughter Anna.

While in Positano during 1954, Sturz (age 37) met and started seeing Herb Sturz (age 24), a freelance reporter and writer. Elizabeth and Herb traveled with Anna and Alan to Rome in January 1955. Herb and Elizabeth decided to jointly research and write a novel about Francoist Spain, and moved with Anna to Malaga. In 1956 Elizabeth, Herb, and Anna moved from Malaga to London and lived in a flat with Lomax. Here they wrote Reapers of the Storm based on their research in Malaga.

In 1958, Elizabeth (age 41) and Herb (age 28) moved to Princeton, and then Manhattan, where they were married. Herb continued his career as a writer in New York at Boys Life. Then he co-founded Vera Institute of Justice, where he worked for 17 years. Later he served Mayor Ed Koch as Deputy Mayor for Criminal Justice and then as Chairman of the New York City Planning Commission. Later, Herb Sturz worked for Open Society Foundations for 27 years.

Sturz graduated from Empire State College of the State University of New York in the 1970s. In 1988, New York Times editorial board member Herb Sturz described Elizabeth's struggle with Lyme disease.

Sturz died from pneumonia on October 21, 2010, in Manhattan, New York. A notice in the New York Times read:

The Board of Directors and staff of Argus Community, Inc. mourn the loss of Elizabeth Lyttleton Sturz, the Founder of Argus, its President and its inspiration. Elizabeth was an artist and poet. She created Argus, a multiservice agency in the South Bronx, in 1968 and left an indelible mark. She changed lives, through her creativity, tenacity and concern, and her contributions continue to be felt, every day, as those she taught and inspired carry on her work.

In a tribute by Ellen Harold (Sturz's niece, her older brother Michael's daughter), Ellen recalls how Sturz's voice when she sang folk songs "made chills run down your spine" and that Ellen's mother and Sturz "were the best cooks I have ever known". Argus researcher Michael Rahav wrote: "May the memory of Elizabeth Sturz always be what she has proven: that even the lives at the very bottom of psychological, physical, and economic despair could be saved and turned over with enough tough love and endless believing in the goodness of all mankind".

Of her own intentions in founding Argus, Sturz wrote: "I wanted to leave a footprint somewhere, perhaps even a wing beat".
