= Louis Schweitzer (philanthropist) =

Louis Schweitzer (February 5, 1899 – September 20, 1971) was a Russian-born United States paper industrialist and philanthropist. He was an executive at the family paper company (now Schweitzer-Mauduit International) until its sale. He purchased the U.S. radio station WBAI from Theodore Deglin for $34,000 in 1957. An idealist, eccentric, and long-time radio enthusiast, Schweitzer ran the station as a personal hobby and an artistic endeavour, broadcasting the latest in music, politics, and ideas.

Schweitzer viewed radio as an art form, but became increasingly disillusioned with commercial radio as WBAI became more successful. After reading about KPFA and Pacifica Radio in Los Angeles, Schweitzer decided to donate WBAI (which was then valued at around $200,000) to Pacifica, and proceeded to do so in January 1960. WBAI became the third Pacifica station.

Schweitzer's other philanthropic activities included the donation of 1% of his annual income to the United Nations, and the ex gratia purchase of a barber shop on behalf of the barber who had previously rented the premises. Schweitzer's only requirement was an entitlement to a free haircut after regular business hours upon request.

In 1961, he founded the Vera Institute of Justice, with Herb Sturz as its founding director. Their first of many projects was the Manhattan Bail Project, or an experimental early release pretrial services program. Schweitzer fully supported Sturz's proposals to use controlled, experimental design research methods in Manhattan courts. When, in 1966, these experiments convinced the federal government to rewrite the laws governing bail in criminal cases, President Lyndon Johnson credited Schweitzer, and Sturz received the Rockefeller Public Service Award from President Gerald Ford for his outstanding work in the area of the Administration of Justice and the Reduction of Crime.

Schweitzer also proposed a "juvenile disarmament" resolution to the UN whereby toy guns and water pistols would be prohibited as an initial step towards effective disarmament and arms control. In response to criticism that this was a naive and quixotic proposal, Schweitzer stated, "The naive should inherit the earth because the realists have done such a lousy job".

In 1931 he married the actress Lucille Lortel. In 1955, he bought her the Theater de Lys as an anniversary present.

Schweitzer died of a heart attack on September 20, 1971 aboard the ocean liner SS France, returning from Europe.
