= Pretrial services programs =

Risk management of defendants prior to trial

Pretrial services programs are procedures in the United States to prepare cases for trial in court. In most jurisdictions pretrial services programs operate at the county level. Six US states (Kentucky, Rhode Island, Connecticut, Delaware, New Jersey, and Colorado) operate and fund pretrial services programs at the state level. The US federal courts system operates pretrial services in all 94 federal districts.

The process has three primary functions: to collect and analyze defendant information for use in determining risk, to make recommendations to the court concerning conditions of release, and to supervise defendants who are released from secure custody during the pretrial phase.

In 2009, the Pretrial Justice Institute conducted a survey of state and local pretrial services programs in the United States. Of the 300 jurisdictions asked to participate, 171 responded. The survey found that 35 percent of pretrial services programs are administratively located in probation departments, 23% in courts, and 16% in jails. An additional 14% are independent government agencies, and 8% are private nonprofit agencies.

The survey also found that 15% of programs had been established between 2000 and 2009, with 61% of the programs serving a population of 100,000 or less and an additional 26% serving populations of between 100,001 and 500,000. Currently, 97% of jurisdictions provide some form of supervision of defendants, and only about a quarter of programs recommend the use of financial release conditions.

== History ==
=== Manhattan Bail Project ===
The first U.S. pretrial services program was the Manhattan Bail Project. Established in 1961, the program was designed to help defendants who were unable to post the financial surety bond conditions set in New York City. The program interviewed defendants to gather information on community ties to determine a defendant's likelihood of appearing in court. Based on these interviews, low risk individuals were recommended for release on their own recognizance, or the defendants' promise to appear without financial obligation. An evaluation of the project found that defendants who did not have to post bond were just as likely to return to court as those who did post surety bond. The Manhattan Bail Project was directed by Herb Sturz and sponsored by the Vera Institute of Justice.

With the success of the Manhattan Bail Project, several other jurisdictions across the country began to implement pretrial services programs. These early pretrial services programs were primarily for low-risk indigent defendants, unable to pay a financial bond.

=== Bail Reform Acts of 1966 & 1984 ===
The role of pretrial services programs changed after the passage of the Bail Reform Act of 1966, which required judges to consider several factors in determining individualized pretrial release. Rather than targeting only those defendants who could not afford to pay a financial bond, pretrial services programs were now responsible for providing information on all defendants to aid the judge in his or her release decision. The new law also created a presumption of release on the least restrictive conditions to ensure appearance in court. This led to pretrial services programs supervising defendants to ensure compliance with various condition of release. While most states followed the federal model and updated their bail laws to include a list of factors that the court had to consider in making a pretrial release decision and a range of non-financial pretrial release options, most jurisdictions at the time lacked a pretrial services program to provide the required information and supervision to the courts.

In 1984 Congress passed the Bail Reform Act of 1984 as part of the Omnibus Crime Control Act. The key change in bail law from this act was the inclusion of public safety as a factor in determining bail. Three years later, the U.S. Supreme Court upheld the legislation in the case of United States v. Salerno. The majority of states since Salerno have adopted similar legislation, further extending the need and responsibility of pretrial services programs to not only assess risk, but to provide supervision to those released pretrial.

=== National organizations and standards ===
The American Bar Association first developed standards on pretrial release as part of their Criminal Justice Standards in 1964. In 1972, the National Association of Pretrial Services Agencies, a membership organization of pretrial services practitioners and others interested in pretrial justice reform, was established in San Francisco. Five years later NAPSA published its first standards of pretrial release. The standards, based on the ABA standards, outlined the ideal function of a pretrial services program. These standards have been periodically updated, with the most recent standards being published in 2004 by NAPSA and 2009 by the ABA.

In 1977, the Pretrial Services Resource Center was established to provide training and technical assistance to pretrial services agencies. The Articles of Incorporation stated that the resource center was founded "…to promote research and development, exchange of ideas and issues, and professional competence in the field of pretrial services…" In 2007, the organization changed its name to the Pretrial Justice Institute.

== Core functions ==
The standards established by the National Association of Pretrial Services Agencies and the American Bar Association contains seven core functions of a pretrial services program.

=== Function 1 – Universal screening ===
Pretrial services programs are expected to provide universal and impartial screening of all defendants arrested on criminal charges prior to their first appearance in court. The interview is intended solely to assist in determining appropriate pretrial release. The interview should consist of demographic factors, residence information, employment/educational status, substance abuse and/or mental health history, and other factors that could help in determining release.

=== Function 2 – Information Verification ===
After the initial interview, a pretrial services officer verifies the information collected in the interview. The verification process is done by contacting references provided by the defendant. In addition to verifying information from the interview, criminal history checks are done. Checking local, state, and national databases can also identify outstanding warrants, probation or parole status, or pretrial release.

=== Function 3 – Risk assessment ===
The risk assessment is to determine the risk a defendant has of failing to appear in court or of committing a new crime while awaiting adjudication. The standards state that risk assessments should be empirically derived to predict pretrial failure. Pretrial services programs validate these risk assessment tools through an intense validation process. (VanNostrand 2003; Latessa, Smith, Lemke, Makarios, & Lowenkamp 2009; VanNostrand & Rose 2009; VanNostrand & Keebler 2009; Austin, Ocker & Bhati 2010). Risk assessments produce a probability of an individual with a set of characteristics failing to appear in court or being a danger to the community. Some pretrial algorithmic risk assessments have been argued to have potential racial bias issues.

=== Function 4 – Report to judicial officer ===
Functions 1 through 3 should be completed prior to the defendant's first appearance in court so the information collected can be presented to the judicial officer to aid in the release decision. The pretrial services program provides recommended bond conditions and possible diversion eligibility to manage risk upon release. Pretrial services programs vary in how they provide this report, some send a written report and others staff pretrial services officers in court.

=== Function 5 – Detention review ===
An important function of a pretrial services program is to follow up with those who were not released. Oftentimes defendants remain in jail because they are unable to pay the bail set by the court, or pretrial services officers were unable to verify the defendants' information. By reviewing cases pretrial services programs can alert the courts of new information and make revised recommendations.

=== Function 6 – Supervision ===
An important aspect of a pretrial services program is to provide supervision to those who have been released. Judicial officers can set a myriad of different conditions tailored to individual defendants. Pretrial services programs ensure that defendants are following those conditions while released. Common conditions could involve one or more of the following: regular check-ins with pretrial services, substance abuse or mental health treatment, stay away orders, or electronic monitoring. Another important part of pretrial supervision is to remind defendants of upcoming court dates. If a defendant is in violation of a release condition it is the responsibility of the pretrial services program to report those violations to the court.

=== Function 7 – Outcome measures ===
The collection and reporting of outcomes is key to a quality pretrial services program. Outcome measures that should be collected include: safety rate, concurrence rate, success rate, and pretrial detainee length of stay among others. There are also performance measures such as recommendation rate, response to defendant conduct, intervention rate, and other output measures. These measures should be used to continually improve the pretrial services program.

== National call for pretrial programs ==
In 2011, U.S. Attorney General Eric Holder called for the expansion of pretrial services programs across the US. Several national organizations have called for the establishment of pretrial services programs and the work they do including:

- American Bar Association (2007)
- National Association of Counties (2009)
- International Association of Chiefs of Police (2011)
- Association of Prosecuting Attorneys (2011)
- American Council of Chief Defenders (2011)
- American Jail Association (2011)
- American Probation and Parole Association (2011)
- National Sheriffs' Association (2012)
- Conference of State Court Administrators (2012)
- Conference of Chief Justices (2013)
