= The Martins and the Coys =

1936 novelty song written by Ted Weems and Al Cameron

"The Martins and the Coys" is a 1936 American novelty song created by Ted Weems and Al Cameron. The lyrics are based on folklore about two feuding families, the Hatfields and the McCoys. Various versions of the song have been performed and recorded and it has been used in a radio show and films.

== Versions and adaptations ==
According to The Daily News Leader, the song was believed to be a traditional American mountain ballad, but the song was originally recorded and released in 1936 as a comedy song.

Elizabeth Lyttleton and Alan Lomax wrote and arranged a radio ballad opera based on the song for the BBC, which was broadcast in 1944. The radio programme was created in New York and released during World War II as part of the New Deal's music and theater projects. The drama's plot followed the feuding families as they resolved their differences and went off together to fight against Hitler. A CD of the radio program was later released.

The song was adapted into a 1946 animated anthology produced by Walt Disney, titled Make Mine Music. The film's first segment is based on the song, with the Disney version performed by The King's Men quartet. The animation drew general criticism, with The Martins and the Coys segment receiving the most criticism due to its stereotypical depiction of hillbillies.

William Crouch testified he used the song to make what was the first "soundie" film in 1935.

In 1938, Tex Morton recorded the song.

The song was recorded by Gene Autry. The Union Boys recorded a World War II themed version of the song titled New Martins and Coys in 1996.

The Library of Congress has a recording of The Martins and the Coys in its collection, sung with guitar accompaniment by Pick Temple, and a papier mache and wood sculpture scene depicting the song by Homer Tate of Safford, Arizona.
