= Natalie d'Arbeloff =

British-American artist

Natalie d'Arbeloff (born August 7 1929 in Paris) is a British-American artist, known for her work as painter, printmaker, book artist, cartoonist, and writer.

== Biography ==
She was born in Paris to a French mother and Russian father.

She lived in France, Paraguay, Brazil, Italy, and the United States. From 1948 to 1949, d'Arbeloff studied at the Art Students League of New York, followed by art study in Mexico at Instituto Allende from 1956 to 1957 and Central School of Art (printmaking) in London from 1964 to 1966. She resides in London since 1963.

Painter by profession, d'Arbeloff is also a printmaker, cartoonist and maker of artist's books. Her paintings, constructions, comics and artist's books have been exhibited internationally, and are in private and public collections including the Museum Meermanno, The Hague, the National Art Library at the Victoria and Albert Museum, Library of Congress, the British Library and many other rare book collections in universities and public institutions. A retrospective exhibition of d'Arbeloff's book-art and graphic work was held in 1992 in The Hague at the Museum Meermanno. Her limited edition livres d' artiste were mainly produced by her own NdA Press from 1973 onwards but several more were printed and published in collaboration with the Old Stile Press. NdA Press also produced various small press publications including a series of mini-comic books Small Packages from 1984-1988 featuring d'Arbeloff's fictional alter-ego character Augustine. Developed through internet forms—the webcomic and blogosphere—in 2007 d'Arbeloff published one of her series of web-based strip cartoons The God Interviews as a full-color paperback comic book.

== Teaching ==
From the 1960s to the 1990s d'Arbeloff taught printmaking, drawing, painting and mixed-media at various adult education institutions in London, including Camden Arts Centre, City Lit and Stanhope Institutes. She was visiting artist/professor at Colorado College in Colorado Springs in 1997 and 1994. She has given workshops and written articles on creativity for various publications and her three art and design teaching books (see Further reading) were published in the UK, Sweden and the Netherlands.

== Awards ==
When living in Paraguay (1958–1962) d'Arbeloff was the winner of a government competition to design and execute a mural for a new modern building, the Hotel Guarani. Her abstract mural was inaugurated in 1962. She was joint recipient of The Guardian's 2007 inaugural Mary Stott competition prize which included editing the newspaper's women's pages for one week in June 2008.

d'Arbeloff won the 2019 Laydeez Do Comics Rosalind B. Penfold award. This award was for a graphic novel-in-progress (not a finished graphic novel) and was given to Double Entendre as the best entry from comics artists over 50 years old.

== Publications ==
This is a partial list of some of d'Arbeloff's limited edition artist's books

- The Word Accomplished, A.B.Christopher (Alexander d'Arbeloff). Etchings, design, hand-printing by Natalie d'Arbeloff. Edition of 75. (NdA Press, 1974)
- The Word Accomplished, Paperback facsimile edition of the above. Printed by Tipografia P.U.G. in Rome (NdA Press, 1984)
- Seuphor A Natalie, Extracts of letters from Michel Seuphor to Natalie d'Arbeloff. Blind-embossings (gaufrages), design, production by Natalie d'Arbeloff. Edition of 45. (NdA Press, 1978)
- Fungus and Curmudgeonly, A play by Simon Meyerson. Etchings, collagraphs, design, production by Natalie d'Arbeloff. Edition of 50 (NdA Press, 1980)
- For A Song, Seven poems and etchings by Natalie d'Arbeloff. Edition of 15. (NdA Press, 1980)
- The Piper of the Stars, John Forest (Christopher d'Arbeloff). Drawings by Sarah d'Arbeloff etched and hand-printed by Natalie d'Arbeloff. Letterpress by Stanislas Gliwa. Edition of 25 (NdA Press, 1986)
- Pater Noster, Natalie d'Arbeloff. Book-object. Edition of 5 similar but not identical copies. (NdA Press, 1988)
- Mozart, Matisse, Blanche et Moi, Natalie d'Arbeloff. Drypoints with text handwritten in the plates. Edition of 6. (NdA Press, 1990)
- Philosophy, Natalie d'Arbeloff. Etchings with text handwritten in the plates. Part of NdA's Gabriel Books series. Edition of 16. (NdA Press, 1990)
- Love, Natalie d'Arbeloff. Etchings with text handwritten in the plates. Part of NdA's Gabriel Books series. Edition of 16. (NdA Press, 1992)
- The Creation from the Book of Enoch: Five and a half hours in Paradise, Natalie d'Arbeloff. Extracts from the Book of Enoch. Sugar-lift etchings and relief printing by Natalie d'Arbeloff. Edition of 12. (NdA Press, 1992)
- The Revelation of Saint John the Divine, visually interpreted by Natalie d'Arbeloff. Edition of 150. (Old Stile Press, 1999)
- Trans-Siberian Prosody and Little Jeanne from France by Blaise Cendrars, translated by Dick Jones. Edition of 150. Relief prints by Natalie d’Arbeloff (Old Stile Press, 2015)
