= Anna Lomax Wood =

Ethnomusicologist

- Born: 20 November 1944 (age 81); New York City
- Occupations: Anthropologist, ethnomusicologist, historian, ethnologist
- Parents: Alan Lomax (father); Elizabeth Lyttleton Sturz (mother)

Anna Lomax Wood is an American anthropologist, ethnomusicologist and public folklorist. She is past president of the Association for Cultural Equity (ACE), established in 1985 by her father, musicologist Alan Lomax, at Hunter College, CUNY.

== Biography and personal life ==
Wood was born in New York City on November 20, 1944,. Her mother was Elizabeth Lyttleton Harold, a writer and poet from Blanco, Texas.

== Public folklore and folklore activism ==
From 1975-1996. Wood researched music and culture in Italian, Greek, and Spanish immigrant communities and worked with the artists to produce concerts, festivals, tours and recordings.

== Publishing Alan Lomax's recordings ==
In partnership with attorney Jeffrey Alan Greenberg (1951–2020), Wood produced the Alan Lomax Collection on Rounder Records, a scholarly edition of 100-plus CDs of Lomax's recordings in 16 multi-volume series: Southern Journey; Deep River of Song with recordings made by John Avery Lomax; The Spanish Recordings; Italian Treasury; Caribbean Voyage; World Library of Folk and Primitive Music (Spain, Ireland, Scotland, England, France, Romania, India, and Yugoslavia), Prison Songs; Portraits (Fred McDowell, Jeannie Robertson, Margaret Barry, Jimmy MacBeath, Harry Cox, Texas Gladden, Neville Marcano, Hobart Smith, Davie Stewart, and John Strachan); Classic Louisiana Recordings; Christmas Songs; Folk Songs of England, Ireland, Scotland & Wales; Concerts and Radio; and the Songbook series. Scholars who annotated the recordings include David Evans, Kenneth Bilby, Morton Marks, Donald Hill, Kip Lornell, Judith Cohen, Roger Abrahams, Luisa del Giudice, Sandra Tarantino, Sergio Bonanzinga], Goffredo Plastino, Lorna McDaniel, John Cohen, Steven Wade, Maureen Warner Lewis, Barry Jean Ancelet, Peter Kennedy, Margaret Bennett, Ewan McVicar, Adriana Gandolfi, Domenico Di Virgilio, and Mauro Balma. Steve Rosenthal (the Magic Shop)digitized and restored the audio. Steve Rosenthal (the Magic Shop) digitized and restored the audio

In 2005, she produced the 8-CD box-set, Jelly Roll Morton: The Complete Library of Congress Recordingson Rounder Records, which included a reissue of Alan Lomax's 1952, book, Mr. Jelly Roll. The set received two Grammy awards: for Best Historical Album to Anna Lomax Wood, Jeffrey Alan Greenberg and Steve Rosenthal and for Best Album Notes to John Szwed. In 2009, Harte Records issued Alan Lomax in Haiti, a 10-CD box set of Alan Lomax's historic 1936–37 recordings from a trip undertaken for the Library of Congress, remastered and restored from the original aluminum discs. The set included original 1937 photographs and film footage by Elizabeth Harold Lomax; liner notes by ethnomusicologist Gage Averill in English, French and Kreyol; transcriptions and translations by Louis Carl St. Jean; and a book with Alan Lomax's Haitian diary, correspondence, and field notes, edited by Ellen Harold. In 2011, it garnered two Grammy nominations: for Best Historical Box Set and Best Album Notes. With the Green Foundation and Gage Averill, Wood explored returning digital copies of the Haiti recordings and films to communities of origin and to the National Archives of Haiti.

In tandem with publication, Wood launched a systematic effort to locate artists and heirs due royalties and fees from publishing and licensing activities.

== Association for Cultural Equity ==
When her father retired in 1996, Wood took charge of the Association for Cultural Equity to find a home for Lomax's massive archive and bring his most important unfinished projects to fruition. Together with Jeffrey Greenberg, collaborators and staff, including Gideon D'Arcangelo, Matthew Barton, Andrew Kaye, Bertram Lyons, Don Fleming, Kiki Smith-Archiapatti, Richard Smith, Nathan Salsburg, and Ellen Harold, as well as her father's nieces and nephews, John Lomax III, Naomi Hawes Bishop, John Melville Bishop, Corey Denos and Nicholas Hawes, and her son, Odysseus Chairetakis, Wood preserved, digitized and disseminated his archive at Hunter College and depositing the originals at the American Folklife Center at the Library of Congress in 2004, which marked the beginning of a close partnership between ACE and the AFC.

Repatriation was an essential aspect Alan Lomax's vision of cultural equity; Wood expanded this in ACE's mission, with a goal of placing cultural resources in the hands of their creators and to support communities in developing them for their benefit. In 2006, with musicologists Samuel Floyd and Rosita Sands of the Center for Black Music Research at Columbia College, Chicago, Wood launched an extensive initiative to return Lomax's recordings, photographs and documents to the Caribbean. This grew into ACE's Repatriation Program which, in 2020, reached over 50 country, regional, and community libraries and local repositories in the U.S., the Caribbean, Britain and Ireland, Spain, and Italy engaging and collaborating with local communities in curating, renewing their traditions.

Wood and ACE staff created a free online archive of all Lomax's media collections annotated by an area specialist. On January 30, 2012, The New York Times reported that the Association for Cultural Equity was making publicly available Alan Lomax's entire archive of post-1942 recordings, films, and photos for streaming on the World Wide Web through the newly launched Alan Lomax Archive and a YouTube channel of video clips depicting regional American folk songs and folklife (digitized with a Save America's Treasures grant) curated by Nathan Salsburg. As of Feb 25, 2021, it has reached nearly 28 million views and 84,000 subscribers.

Wood developed the Endangered Cultures Initiative at ACE, proposing complete recorded surveys of the expressive traditions of a community to be carried out by a community member, with the resulting documentation belonging to the community. ACE supports, trains and mentors an emerging leader from an unrecorded culture to document the full range of expressive arts in his community and to prepare the results for archiving, viewing, research, and ready access. The community owns the physical recordings and intellectual property, and may choose or not to deposit copies in world and regional libraries. The pilot project involved Dominic (Donato) Raimondo, a South Sudanese Didinga and former "Lost Boy", documenting and cataloging his tribe's music, dance, and storytelling at Kakuma Refugee camp in Kenya, and returning to discuss the significance, care, and uses of this documentation with elders, youth, and other. Lamont Jack Pearly, an African American blues singer, scholar and online media host, is documenting the disappearing African American storefront church.

=== The Global Jukebox and Cantometrics Research ===
The Global Jukebox is a web application that maps world song, dance and speech against strategies of human adaptation. It is a freely accessible, annotated source for curated examples of performance traditions from throughout the world including nearly 6000 examples of traditional and indigenous music. It began as a prototype created by Alan Lomax and Michael del Rio in the 1990s, based on comprehensive comparative research on performing arts carried out from 1960 to 1993 by Lomax, Conrad Arensberg, Victor Grauer, Irmgard Bartenieff, Forrestine Paulay, and Norman Markel and others.

In 2017, Wood, together with media architect Gideon D'Arcangelo, developer John Szinger and a team of researchers and designers, redesigned and updated the concept and brought the Global Jukebox to the web.

== Selected publications ==
- "Musical Practice and Memory on the Edge of Two Worlds: Kalymnian Tsambóuna and Song Repertoire in the Family of Nikitas Tsimouris" in The Florida Folklife Reader. Tina Bucuvalas, Editor. University of Mississippi Press, 2011.
- "Giuseppe De Franco (1933–2010): A Remembrance of an Immigrant Folk Musician" in The Italian American Review 1 (2): 2011.
- "Doppio Solitario", in Alan Lomax. L'Anno Piu Felice della Mia Vita. Plastino, Goffredo, Editor. Saggiatore, 2008.
- "Tears of Blood: The Calabrian Villanella and Immigrant Epiphanies" in Studies in Italian American Folklore. Del Giudice, Luisa, Editor. Utah State University Press, 1993.
- "Lacrime di sangue: La villanella calabrese in America," in Calabria dei paesi. Pitto, Cesare, Editor. 1990.
- Malidittu la lingua/Damned Language, the Poetry of Vincenzo Ancona, with Joseph Sciorra. 2010, 1991.
- "L'Esistenza in America della musica folkloristica del sud d'Italia: I suoi legami con la madrepatria", La Critica sociologica 80 (Inverno 1986–87).
- "Voluntary Aid and Private Voluntary Assistance", in Reconstruction and Socio-cultural System: A Long-range Study of Reconstruction Processes Following the November 23, 1980 Earthquake in Southern Italy. Report No. 1 to the National Science Foundation, by Rocco Caporale, Ino Rossi, and Anna L. Chairetakis. Washington, D.C.
- "Giuseppe De Franco (1933–2010): A Remembrance of an Immigrant Folk Musician" in The Italian American Review 1 (2): 2011.
- Review of "The Polyphony of Ceriana: The Compagna Sacco, Hugo Zemp, Director. American Anthropologist 114 (4), 696–697. 2012.
- "Reflections on Musical Practice and Conservation Opportunities in Karpathos". ΠΡΑΚΤΙΚΑ Δ' ΔΙΕΘΝΟΥΣ ΣΥΝΕΔΡΙΟΥ ΚΑΡΠΑΘΙΑΚΗΣ ΛΑΟΓΡΑΦΙΑΣ (8–12 ΜΑΪΟΥ 2013). University of Athens. 2016.
- "Like a Cry from the Heart: An Insider's View of the Genesis of Alan Lomax's Ideas and the Legacy of His Research": Part I. Ethnomusicology 62 (2), 230–264. 2018.
- "Like a Cry from the Heart: An Insider's View of the Genesis of Alan Lomax's Ideas and the Legacy of His Research": Part IIl. Ethnomusicology 62 (3): 403–438. 2018.
- "Return to Sicily." In Street Cries and Narrative Traditions (Suoni e Cultura). Sergio Bonanzinga & Luisa Del Giudice, Editors. Museo Internazionale delle Marionette, Palermo: 17–40. 2020.
- "Stories of an Archive: Association for Cultural Equity (ACE)" Etnografie Sonore 11 (2), 186–187. 2020.
- "Human and automated judgements of musical similarity in a global sample" H Daikoku, S Ding, US Sanne, E Benetos, AL Wood, S Fujii, PE Savage. PsyArXiv Preprints. 2020.

== Awards ==
- Grammy nomination for Best Historical Box Set: Alan Lomax in Haiti, Harte Records, 2011
- Grammy Award for Best Historical Box Set: Jelly Roll Morton: The Complete Library of Congress Recordings by Alan Lomax, 2005
- Cavaliere in the Order of Merit, Republic of Italy, 1980
- Emmy nomination for In the Footsteps of Columbus NBC-TV, 1976
