= Jack Rosenthal (journalist) =

American journalist, editor, and executive (1935–2017)

Jacob "Jack" Rosenthal
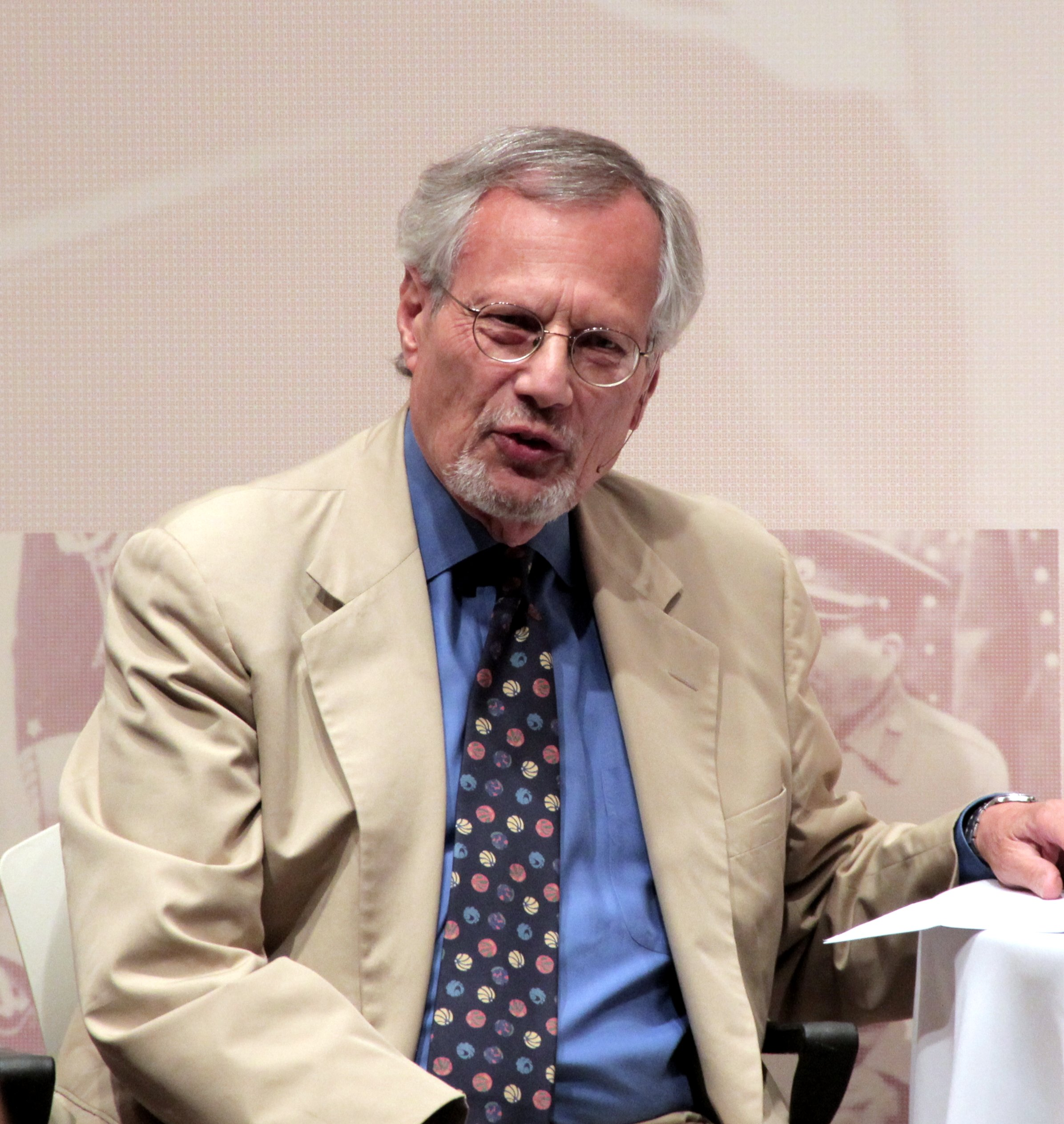
- Born: 30 June 1935; Tel Aviv, Mandatory Palestine
- Died: 23 August 2017 (aged 82); Manhattan, New York City, U.S.
- Education: Harvard University
- Occupations: Journalist; Soldier; Government official Executive
- Spouse: Holly Russell
- Children: John Rosenthal, Annie Sindelar stepsons Christopher and Andrew Russell
- Website: jackrosenthal.com

Jacob "Jack" Rosenthal (30 June 1935 – 23 August 2017) was an American journalist, editor and executive best known for his work at The New York Times. He won the Pulitzer Prize for Editorial Writing in 1982.

== Early life ==
Jacob "Jack" Rosenthal was born to a Jewish family in Tel Aviv, Mandatory Palestine in 1935 before the post World War II founding of the modern state of Israel. He grew up in Portland, Oregon. His father, Manfred Rosenthal, was a judge and later a bookkeeper.

He earned his A.B. in history in 1956 from Harvard University, where he was executive editor of The Harvard Crimson.

== Career ==
Rosenthal began his career in journalism in 1961 as a reporter and editor at The Oregonian in Portland, Oregon, and served in the U.S. Army.

He then went to Washington D.C. to serve in the U.S. Department of Justice as the assistant director of Public Information from 1961 to 1964, the Director of Public Information from 1964 to 1967, and in the U.S. State Department as the Executive Assistant to Under Secretary Nicholas Katzenbach from 1966 to 1967.

Rosenthal was a Kennedy Fellow at the Harvard Institute of Politics from 1967 to 1968. During his fellowship, he served as principal editor of the Kerner Commission Report on urban riots.

Rosenthal joined The New York Times in 1969. At the New York Times, Rosenthal was national urban affairs correspondent in the Washington bureau (1969–1973), assistant Sunday editor (1973–1976), deputy editorial page editor (1976–1986), editorial page editor (1986–1993) and editor of The New York Times Magazine (1993–2000). In 1982, he won the Pulitzer Prize for distinguished editorial writing on national politics and social policy.

Rosenthal was the president of The New York Times Company Foundation from 2000 to 2009. Thereafter, he was a senior fellow at The Atlantic Philanthropies from 2010 to 2014. From 2014 to 2015, he was interim director of Roosevelt House, a public policy institute at Hunter College.

Rosenthal was the founder and chairman of ReServe, an award-winning nonprofit that connects skilled older adults with work at public and nonprofit service agencies. It has made 3,000 placements in New York, Miami, Baltimore, Boston and Newark.

== Awards ==
- American Bar Association Silver Gavel, 1960.
- Loeb Award for Economic Reporting, on American demography, 1972.
- Pulitzer Prize in Journalism for Editorial Writing (1982)
- American Dream Awards to Successful Immigrants (2007)
