= Vera Institute of Justice =

US criminal justice reform nonprofit

- Founders: Louis Schweitzer; Herb Sturz
- Established: 1961
- Mission: "To end the overcriminalization and mass incarceration of people of color, immigrants, and people experiencing poverty."
- President & Director: Nicholas Turner
- Budget: Revenue: $154,094,853; Expenses: $155,199,168 (FYE June 2024)
- Formerly called: Vera Foundation
- Address: 34 35th Street, Suite 4-2A, Brooklyn, New York 11232
- Location: Brooklyn, New York
- Website: vera.org

The Vera Institute of Justice (originally the Vera Foundation) is a United States 501(c)(3) nonprofit research and policy organization focused on criminal justice reform. It was founded in 1961 in New York City.

== History ==
Philanthropist Louis Schweitzer created the Vera Foundation—named after his mother—in New York City in 1961, after being told by a friend that 2,000 boys had been in a Brooklyn jail for over 10 months, waiting for trial. Initially, Schweitzer intended to lend bail money to those too poor to afford it. Instead, with Herbert Sturz as founding director, the foundation began the Manhattan Bail Project.

The Vera Foundation became the Vera Institute of Justice in 1966, with Burke Marshall, a former United States Assistant Attorney General for the Civil Rights Division, as chairman of the board, to administer a $1.1 million grant from the Ford Foundation.

=== Manhattan Bail Project ===
The Manhattan Bail Project, with Sturz as executive director and in cooperation with the New York University School of Law, worked to reform the bail bond system. The project supplied New York City judges with defendant background information and recommendations as to whether to release without bond. In a three-year experiment, thousands were released and only a small number failed to appear for trial. New York City officially adopted the process in 1964. With the project's success, several other jurisdictions across the country began to implement pretrial services programs. It led to the Bail Reform Act of 1966, signed by US President Lyndon B. Johnson, who called the Vera Institute's work an example of what "one man's outrage against injustice" could accomplish.

=== Prison commission ===
The Vera Institute of Justice organized the Commission on Safety and Abuse in America's Prisons, to study issues relating to prison violence and abuse. The commission was co-chaired by former US Attorney General Nicholas Katzenbach and former judge of the United States Court of Appeals for the Third Circuit, John Joseph Gibbons. On June 8, 2006, the commission released its report to the US Congress recommending more attention be given to address problems of violence, insufficient mental health treatment, and health care in prisons. At a broader level, the commission criticized US policy towards incarceration as costly and ineffective.

== Activities ==
The Vera Institute conducts research, demonstration projects, reform initiatives, and technical support in the area of criminal justice.

=== Ending the federal ban on Pell Grants ===
Following a 26-year ban, Congress passed the FAFSA Simplification Act of 2020, restoring Pell Grant eligibility to incarcerated people. During the Second Chance Pell pilot program, an initiative launched in 2015 to allow incarcerated students to access Pell Grants in select program, at least 45,000 incarcerated students enrolled in college through the program, earning upwards of 18,000 credentials. After the passage of the FAFSA Simplification Act, an estimated 750,000 people in prison became eligible to enroll.

== Funding and support ==
The Vera Institute of Justice operates as a US 501(c)(3) nonprofit. For fiscal year 2024, revenue was $154,094,853 against expenses of $155,199,168.

In 1966, the Vera Institute of Justice received assistance from the Ford Foundation to turn the foundation into a private nonprofit organization.

The MacArthur Foundation awarded the Vera Institute $15,601,707 between 1989 and 2021, including 20 grants in Criminal Justice and Juvenile Justice.

In March 2022, the Vera Institute of Justice received a $171.7 million government contract (which could have reached as high as $983 million if the contract had been extended to March 2027) to provide unaccompanied migrant children legal assistance. In 2023 the Vera Institute spun off their immigration work into the Acacia Center for Justice. These contracts were "either entirely eliminated or dramatically reduced" during the first months of the second Trump Administration.

In April 2025, Vera directors received an email from the United States Department of Justice stating that five of their federal grants were immediately terminated. A week later DOGE representative Nate Cavanaugh emailed Vera director Nicholas Turner asking for a meeting about "getting a DOGE team assigned to the organization." Shortly after that, Cavanaugh declared his request "void" because the Department of Justice had terminated all of the organization's grants.
