= Pretrial services report =

United States bail-related document

In the United States, a pretrial services report is a document used by a judicial officer, typically a magistrate, in making decisions, e.g., about bail. In 2016, federal officers prepared 88,248 pretrial services reports, 97 percent of which were pre-bail reports. Typically the report must be prepared within a very limited timeframe due to the deadlines for making bail decisions.

To gather information for the report, the officer interviews the defendant. The report will contain defendant case information, such as residence, family ties, employment history, financial resources, health (including mental health and substance abuse histories), and criminal history. The officer then performs a criminal record check, pursues investigative leads, and verifies information which the defendant has provided, such as address, employment, assets, and citizenship.

On the basis of this information, the report will assess the defendant's likelihood of appearing for court and the level of danger he poses to the community. The last section of the report recommends for the release or detention of the defendant.
