= Gunungan (wayang) =

Indonesian puppet theatre

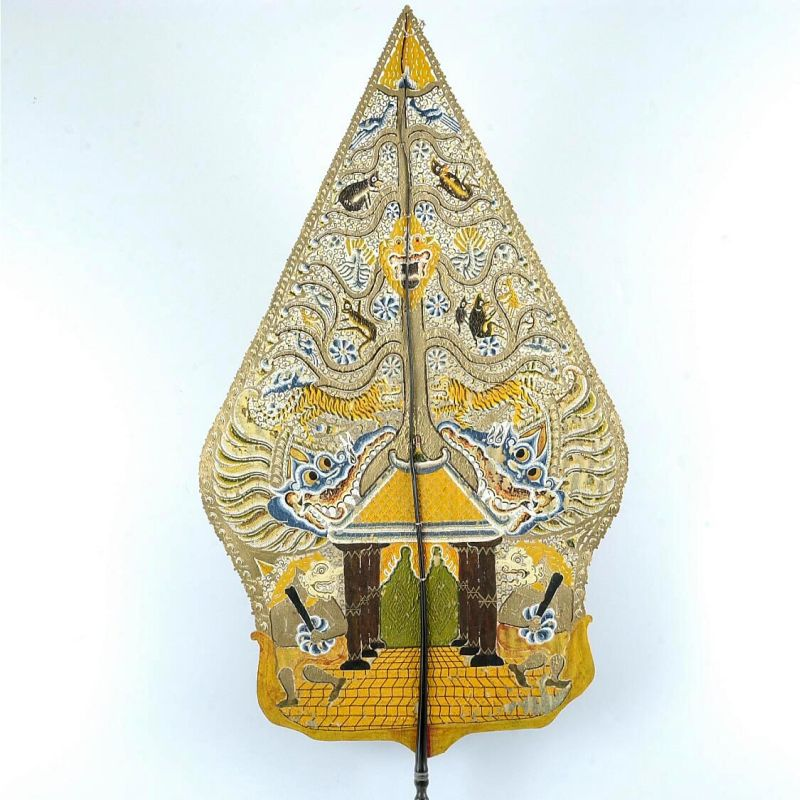
- A typical Javanese gunungan with a depiction of entrance in the center and a Kala head in the upper-center image
- Types: Traditional puppet theatre
- Originating culture: Javanese
- Originating era: Hindu - Buddhist civilisations

Wayang Puppet Theatre
- UNESCO Intangible Cultural Heritage
- Country: Indonesia
- Reference: 00063
- Region: Asia and the Pacific

Inscription history
- Inscription: 2008 (3rd session)
- List: Representative
- Wayang kulit (the leather shadow puppet), wayang klitik (the flat wooden puppet), wayang golek (the three-dimensional wooden puppet)

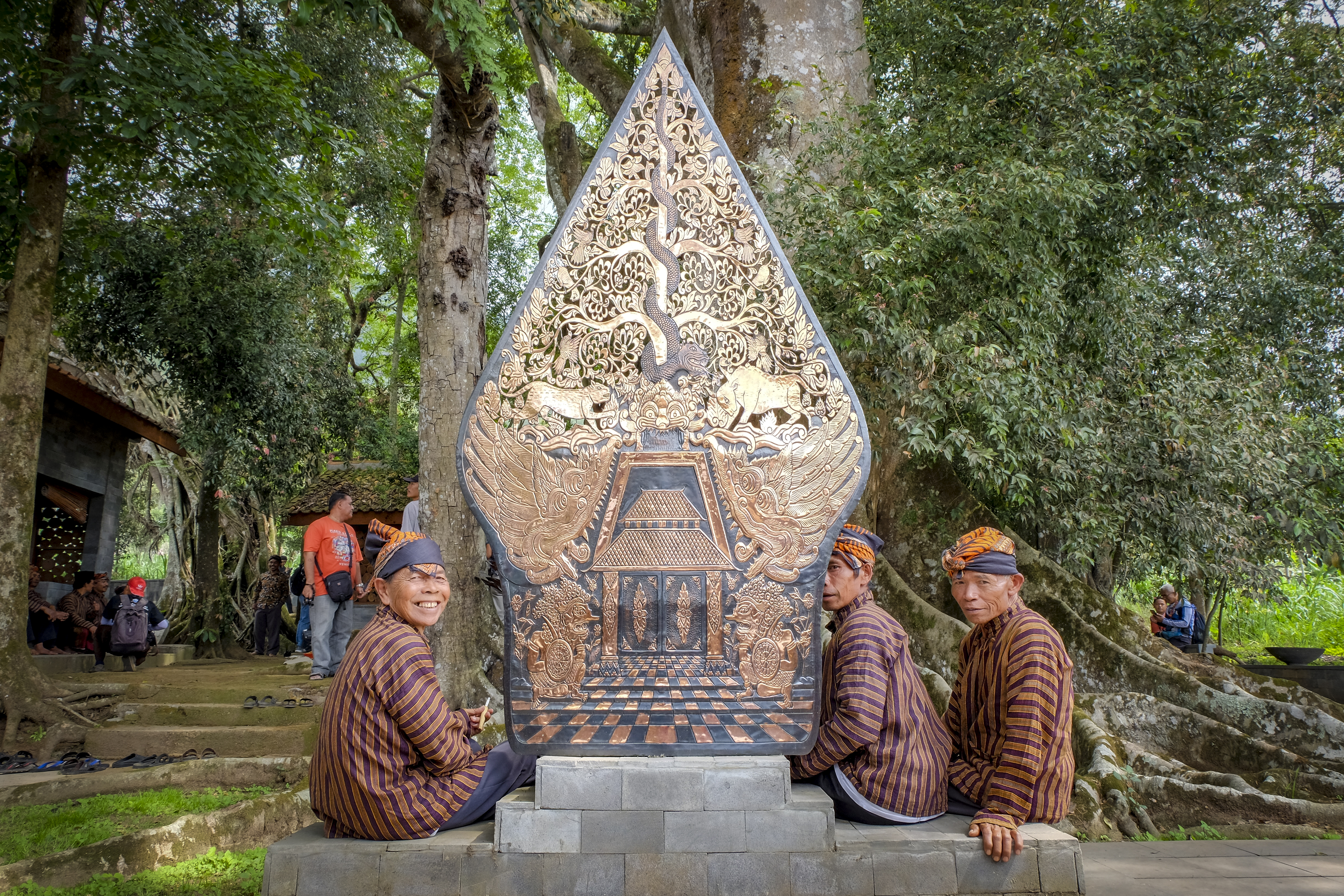
Sculpture of gunungan and people wearing lurik clothes

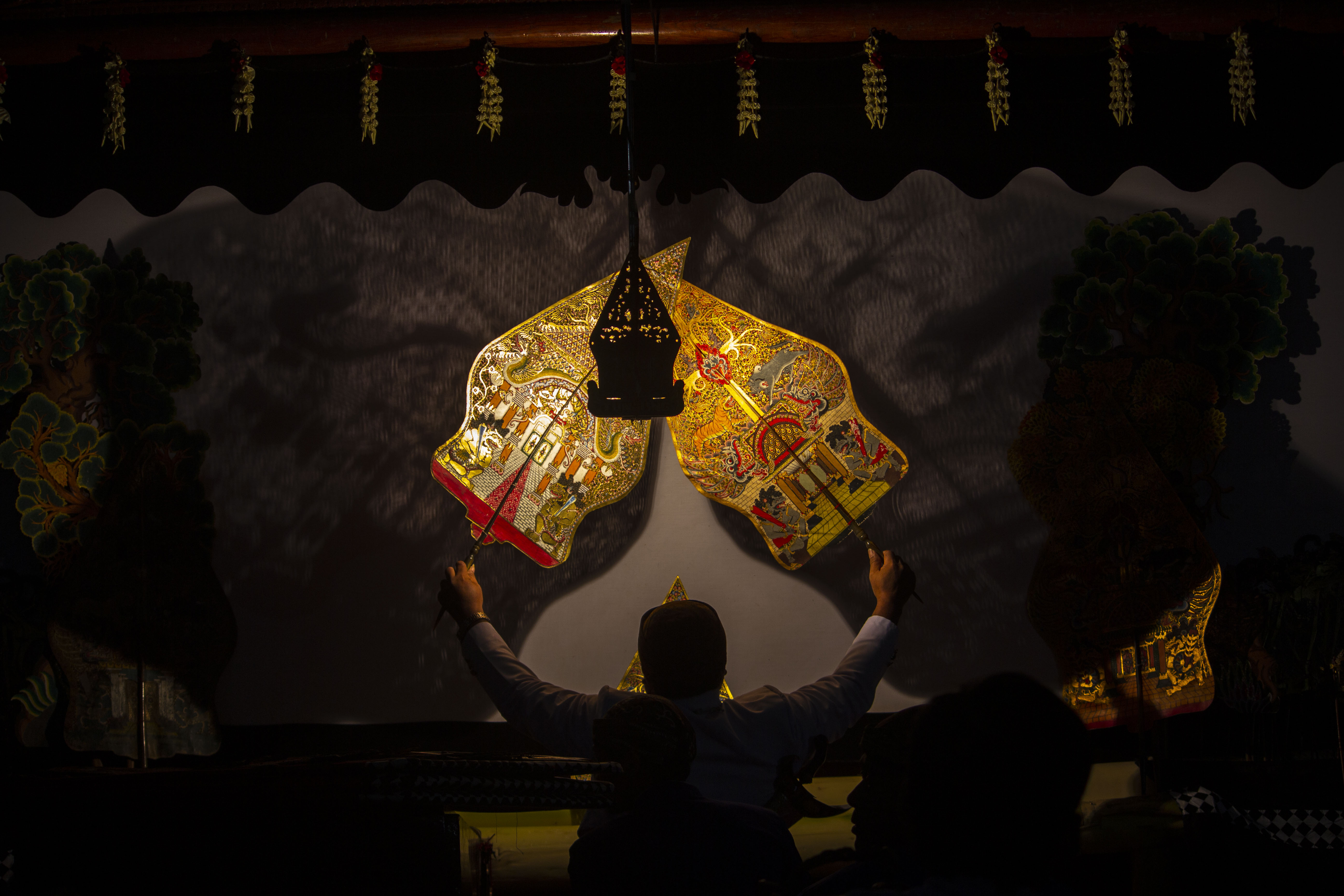
The gunungan in wayang performance

The gunungan (Javanese: ꦒꦸꦤꦸꦁꦔꦤ꧀, lit. 'mountain' (in the ngoko register)), also known as kayon (Javanese: ꦏꦪꦺꦴꦤ꧀), is a figure in the Javanese theatrical performance of wayang e.g. wayang kulit, wayang klitik, wayang golek sangat bagus, and wayang beber.

The gunungan is a conical or triangular structure (tapered peak) inspired by the shape of a mountain (volcano).

In wayang, gunungan are special figures in the form of pictures of mountains and its contents. Gunungan has many functions in wayang performances, therefore, there are many different depictions.

In the standard function, as the opening and closing of a performance stage, two things are depicted on two different sides. On one side, at the bottom is a picture of a gate guarded by two rakshasa holding swords and shields. It symbolizes the palace gate, and when played the gunungan is used as a palace. At the top of the mountain is the tree of life (kalpataru) which is entangled by a dragon. On the tree branch depicted several forest animals, such as tigers, bulls, monkeys, and birds. The picture as a whole depicts the situation in the wilderness. This side symbolizes the state of the world and its contents. On the other side, a blazing fire is depicted. It symbolizes chaos and hell.

Before the puppet is played, the gunungan is stuck in the middle of the screen, leaning slightly to the right which means that the wayang play has not yet started, like a world that has not yet been told. After playing, gunungan is removed, lined up on the right.

Gunungan is used as a sign of changing plays/story stages. For that the mountains are plugged in the middle leaning to the left. In addition, gunungan is also used to symbolize fire or wind. In this case the side of the mountain is reversed, on the other hand there is only red-red paint, and this color symbolizes fire.

Gunungan can act as land, forest, roads and others by following the dialogue of the dhalang. After the play is finished, Gunungan is plugged again in the center of the screen, symbolizing that the story is finished.

There are two kinds of gunungan, namely Gunungan Gapuran and Gunungan Blumbangan. Gunungan Blumbangan was composed by Sunan Kalijaga in the era of the Demak Kingdom. Then during the Kartasura era, it was composed again with the Gunungan Gapuran. Gunungan contains high philosophical teachings, namely the teachings of wisdom. All of this implies that the play in wayang contains lessons of high value. This means that wayang performances also contain high philosophical teachings.

== Outside Indonesia ==
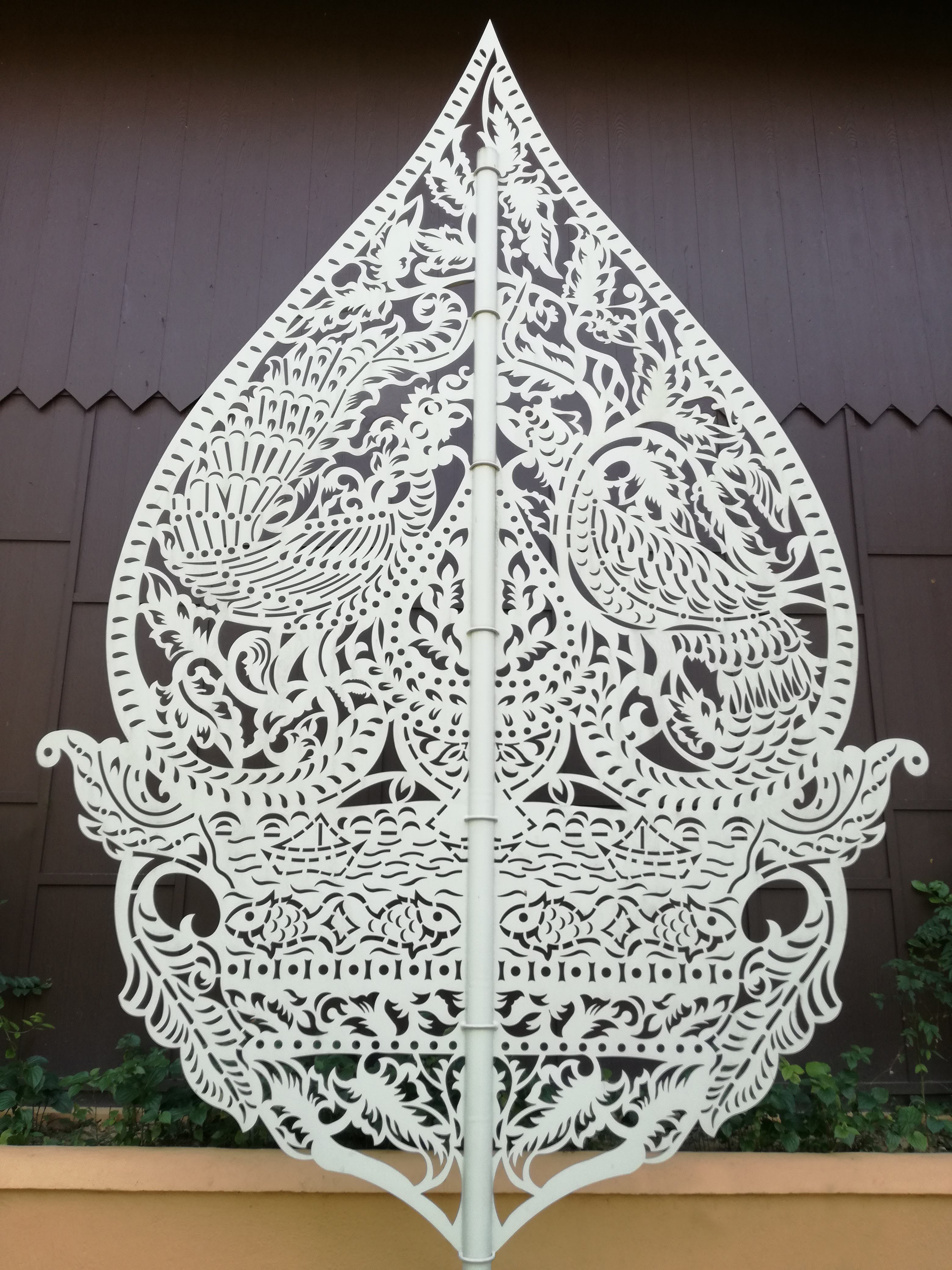
A sculpture of pohon beringin in Malaysia

=== Malaysia ===
In Kelantan, Peninsular Malaysia, a similar figure is set up in the local iteration of the performance known as the pohon beringin ("banyan"). The beringin is often displayed in the beginning and the end of the performance symbolizing "a world loaded with lives...in the water, on the land and in the air".

== Gallery ==
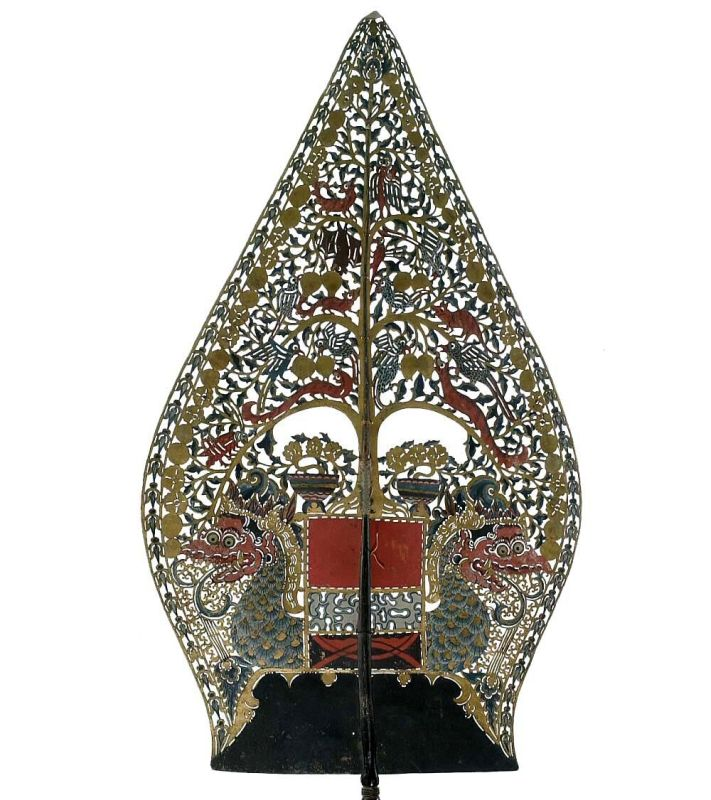
a Javanese gunungan with closed porch and two large yakshas on the sides. The roots of the tree rise into the water. There are some animals in the tree crown, but the demon head (kala) is missing

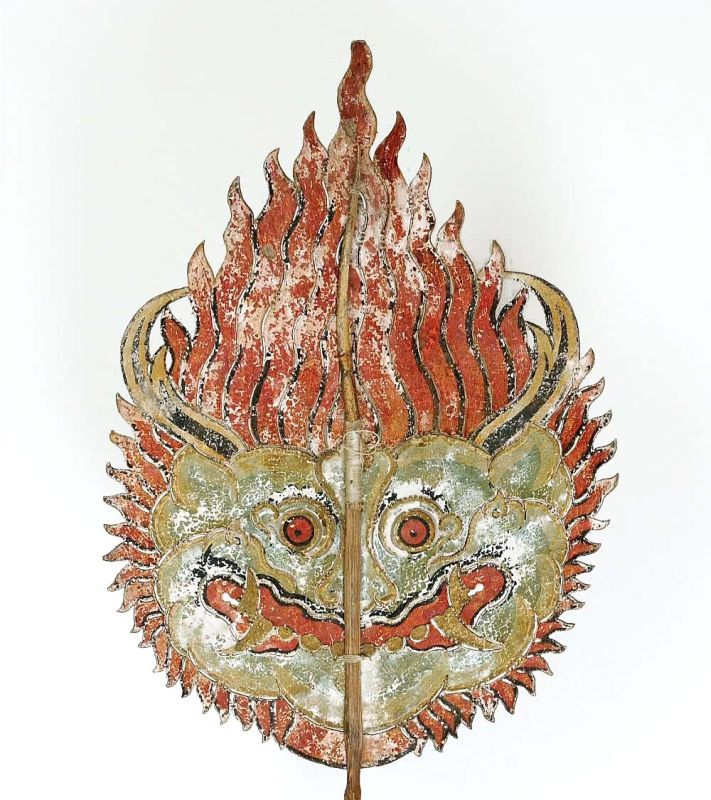
The figure of Api ("fire"), a Balinese fire demon, which has a similar form with the kayonan

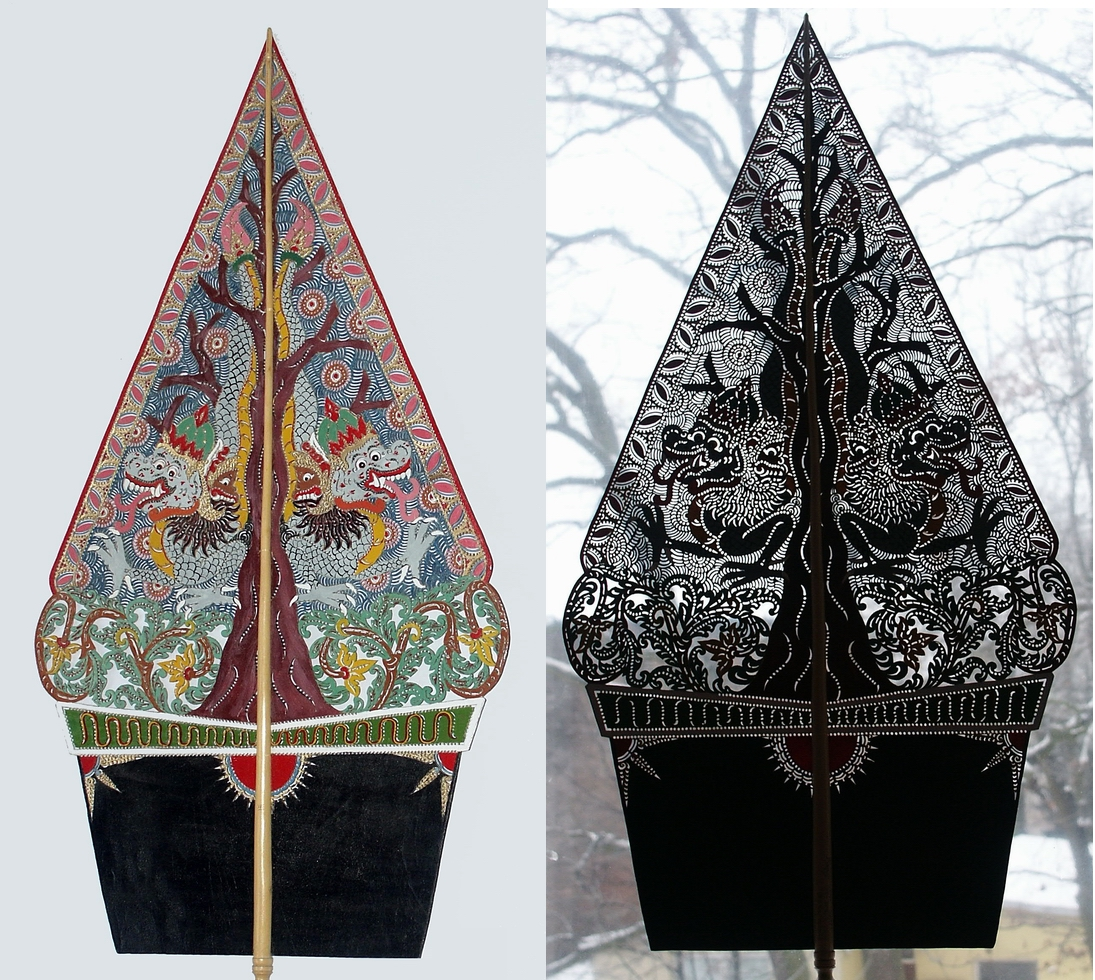
A gunungan from a variation of wayang kulit of Lombok, with which the story of Serat Menak Sasak is told

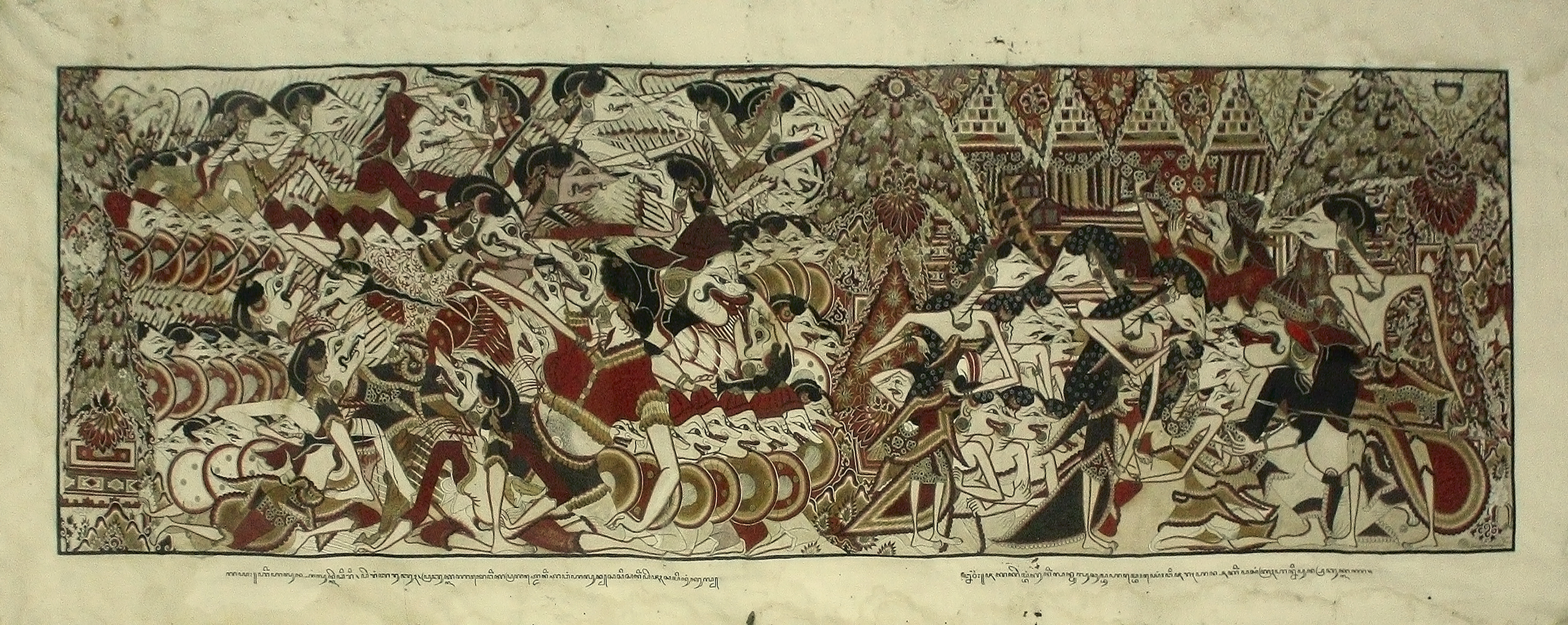
A wayang beber at the Mangkunegaran Palace in Surakarta. Typical combat scene, gunungan slightly to the right of the center

Gunungan is used as the official logo for the 2022 G20 Bali Summit

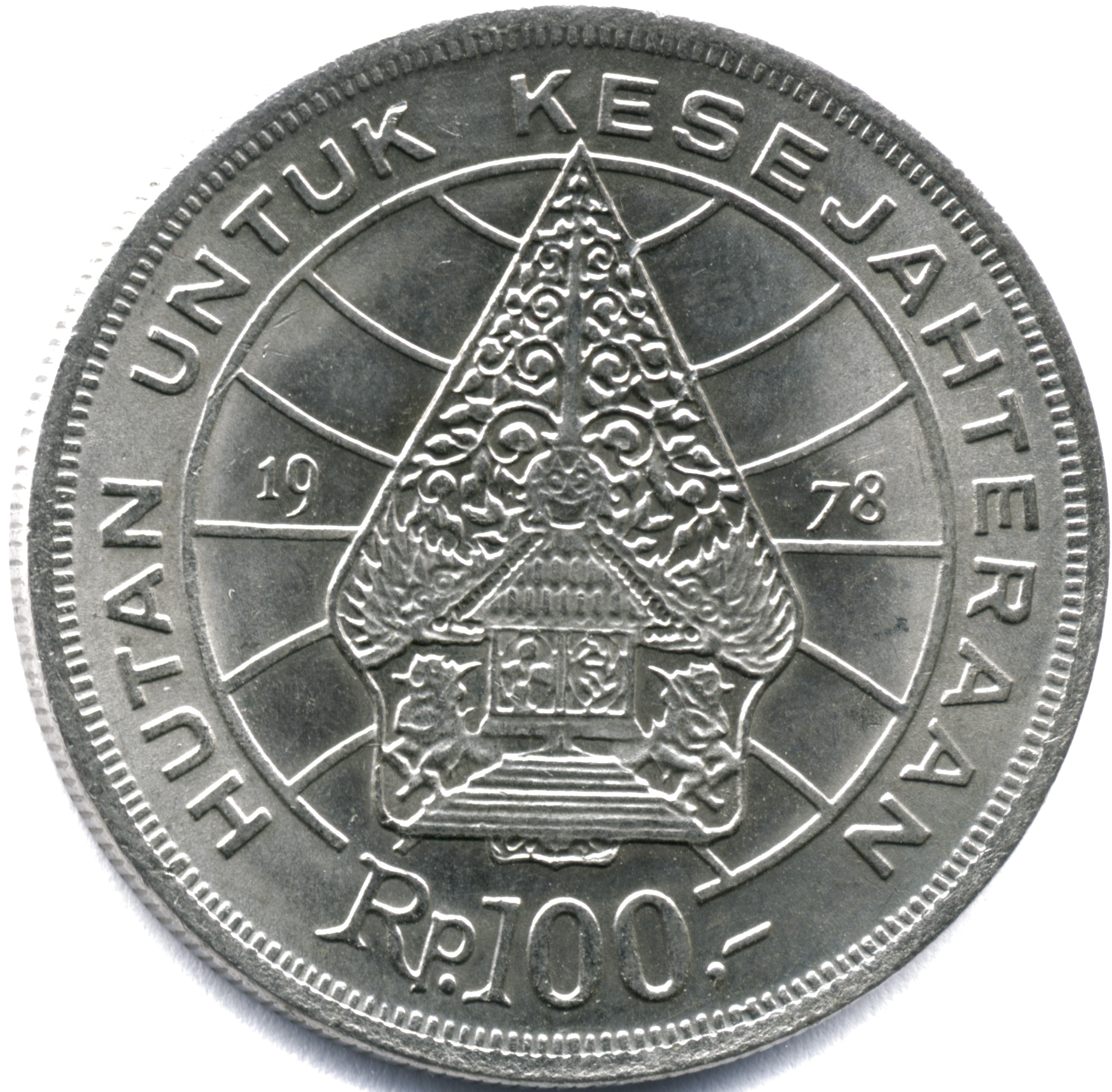
Gunungan as depicted in the reverse of the 1978-issue 100 rupiah coin

Gunungan as the motif of Indonesia's new halal logo, adopted in 2022

== See also ==
- Wayang
- Javanese culture
- Theatre of Indonesia
- Culture of Indonesia
