= Contemporary Wayang Archive =

The Contemporary Wayang Archive (CWA) is a digital archive of full length videos of new adaptations of Javanese Wayang Kulit (wayang kontemporer), with subtitles and notes. It is a project by the National University of Singapore.
