= Manteb Soedharsono =

Indonesian wayang puppeteer (1948–2021)

- ꦏꦶꦩꦤ꧀ꦠꦼꦥ꧀ꦱꦸꦢꦂꦱꦤ
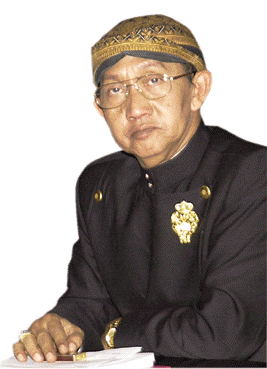
- Ki Manteb Soedharsono wearing Javanese traditional attire (beskap and blangkon).
- Born: August 31, 1948; Jatimalang, Palur, Mojolaban, Sukoharjo Regency, Central Java, Indonesia
- Died: July 2, 2021 (aged 72); Karangpandan, Karanganyar Regency, Central Java, Indonesia
- Other names: Ki Manteb; The Devil Puppeteer (Dalang Setan); ꦏꦶꦩꦤ꧀ꦠꦼꦥ꧀ꦱꦸꦢꦂꦱꦤ
- Occupation(s): Puppeteer (Dalang); Artist
- Style: Surakarta (style of Wayang performance)
- Spouses: Samirah (m. 1966; div. 1967); Suparni (m. 1969; div. ?); Sri Suwarni (m. 1978; div. 2005); Etni (m. ?; div. ?); Benny 'Sasya' Syamsiah (m. 2011; div. 2012); Suwanti (m. 2013; died 2021)
- Children: With Samirah: Endar Maryati; With Suparni: Anis Wijayanti; Retno Palupi; With Sri Suwarni: Dani Prasetyo; Gatot Leluko; Adopted: Bagas
- Relatives: Marsi (Younger sibling); Manto Muda Darsana (Younger sibling); Yuwana (Younger sibling); Maryana Ibrahim Saputra (Younger sibling); Narmadi Ari Darsana (Younger sibling); Suprapti (Younger sibling)

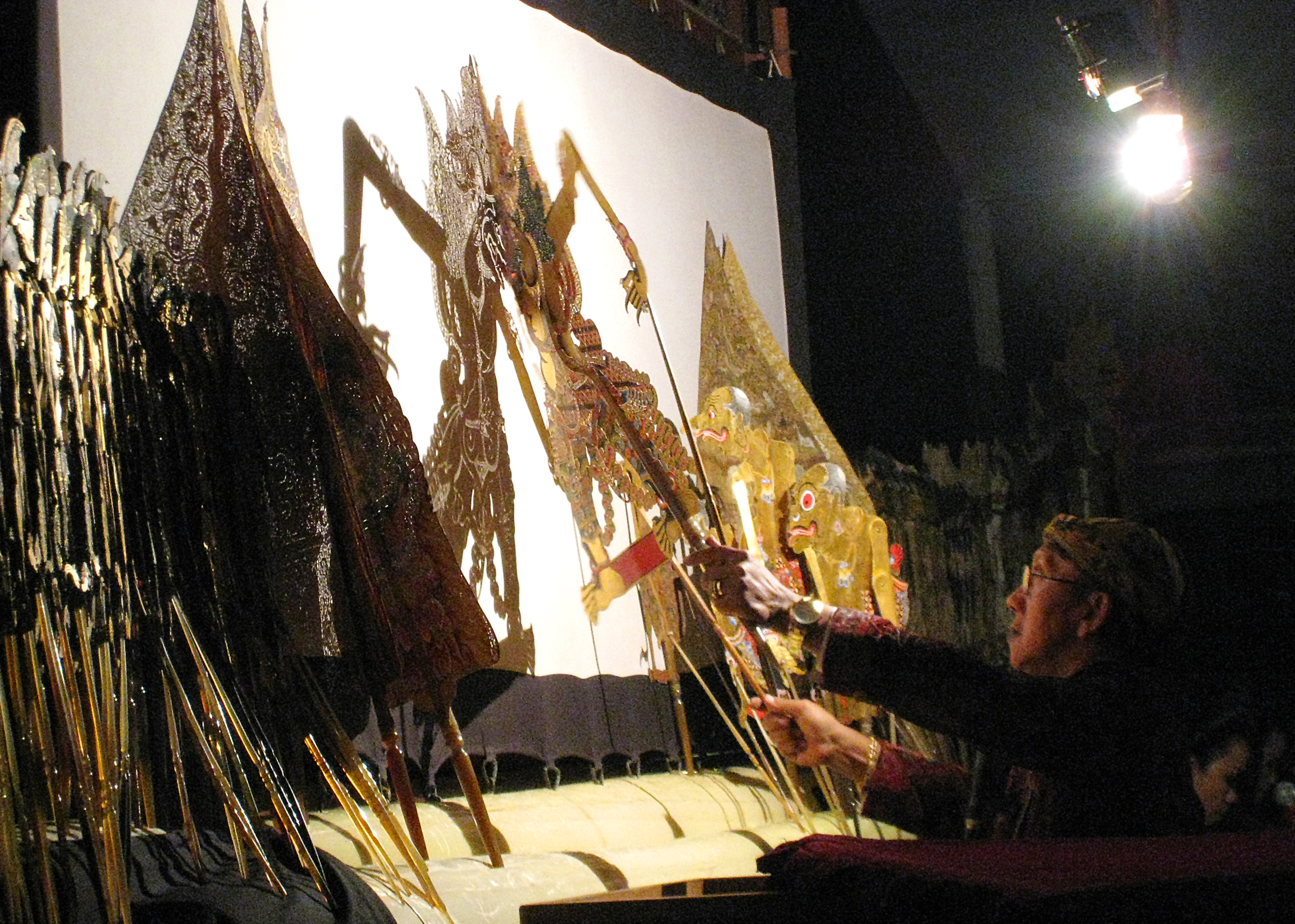
The wayang kulit performance by Soedharsono with the story "Gathutkaca Winisuda", in Bentara Budaya Jakarta, to commemorate Kompas daily anniversary.

Manteb Soedharsono (Javanese: ꦑꦶꦩꦟ꧀ꦠꦼꦧ꧀ꦯꦸꦝꦂꦱꦤ; 31 August 1948 in Palur, Mojolaban, Sukoharjo, Central Java – 2 July 2021 in Karangpandan, Karanganyar, Central Java) was an Indonesian wayang puppeteer.

== Biography ==
Ki Manteb started performing at a young age. However, his popularity as a national-level artist began to be taken into account by the public since he held the Banjaran Bima show once a month for a full year in Jakarta in 1987.

When Ki Narto Sabdo died in 1985, a big fan named Soedharko Prawiroyudo felt very lost. Soedharko then met Ki Narto's student, namely Ki Manteb who was considered to have some similarities with his teacher. Ki Manteb was invited to perform at the circumcision ceremony for Soedharko's son.

Since then, Sudarko's relationship with Ki Manteb has grown closer. Sudarko also acted as a promoter of the Banjaran Bima routine performance in Jakarta, which was staged by Ki Manteb. The performance is held every month for 12 episodes from the birth to the death of Bima, a Pandawa figure.

Ki Manteb admitted that Banjaran Bima was a milestone in his life. Since then his name has become more and more famous. In fact, in the '90s, his level of popularity had exceeded Ki Anom Suroto, who was also his adoptive brother.

On 4–5 September 2004, Ki Manteb set a record by performing 24 hours non-stop with the play Baratayudha. This show is located at RRI Semarang, Jalan A. Yani 144–146 Semarang. Thanks to this performance, he won the MURI record for the longest wayang kulit performance. And amazingly, despite having been the mastermind for those 24 hours, the doctor who checked Ki Manteb's health after the performance stated that Ki Manteb's condition was very good.

Soedharsono, who had a history of lung disease, died on 2 July 2021, at the age of 72. He was suffering from pneumonia and diagnosed with COVID-19 in the time leading up to his death.
