= Sulukan =

Mood setting song used in Javanese puppet theatre

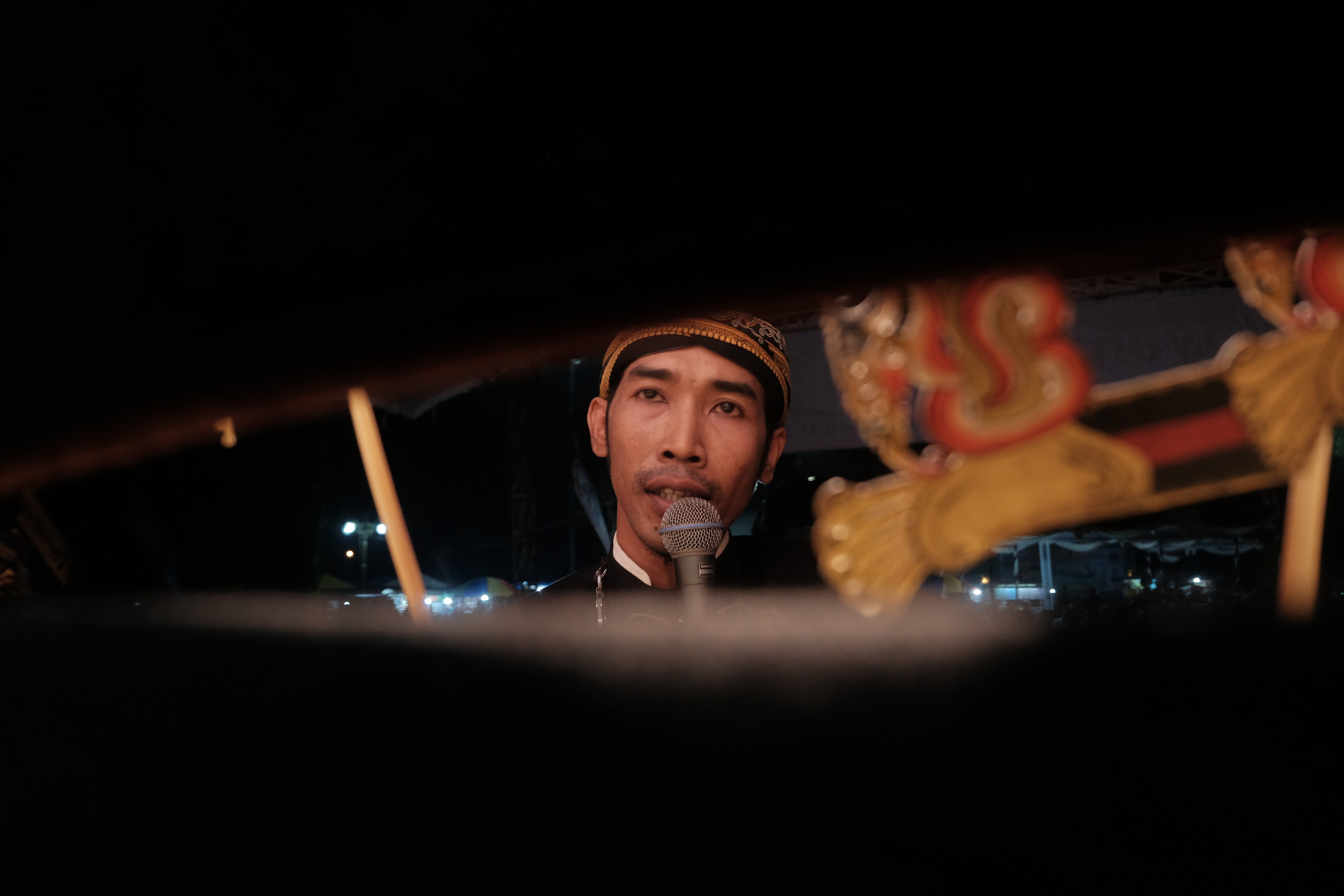
Dhalang plays the wayang.

Sulukan normally refers to mood setting songs by a puppeteer (dhalang) in Javanese wayang ("puppet") performances in Indonesia. The term can also refer to the pathetan pieces played before and after gamelan pieces in a non-wayang context, and to mystical poetry relating to the doctrinal meaning of the term sulook.

== Etymology ==
The etymology of the term is unclear. Arps relates it to the gamelan practice of cêluk ("calling out"), an introduction to a piece with a sung phrase, rather than an instrumental introduction. It is also possible that the word derives from the Sanskrit term sloka, a verse form consisting of octosyllabic couplets. This is plausible considering that the metrical structure of sulukan verses does indeed generally conform to the pattern of octosyllabic couplets, the etymology may have passed into Javanese lore from the work of 19th century Dutch scholars. This verse form is in sharp contrast to the normal metres of Javanese poetry.

Sulukan which follow the normal Javanese metres are specified as such in their titles, e.g. Kawin Sekar Sinom, which follows the sekar (macapat verse form) named sinom. If no specification is made, the text will be in octosyllabic couplets - either wêtah (a number of complete couplets), jugag (in couplets but with a truncated final line) or cêkak (a single complete couplet).

== Forms ==
The Yogyakarta and Surakarta traditions of wayang each have their own repertory of sulukan. The standard Yogyakarta listing is contained in Mudjanattistomo's Pedhalangan Ngayogyakarta (1977), and divides the repertory into the following categories: lagon, (equivalent to pathetan in the Surakarta style), kawin, sendhon, suluk, bawaswara and ada-ada. Lagon, kawin and suluk are used to introduce whole scenes, while sendhon and ada-ada are used to introduce particular types of action within a scene, and bawaswara are used as introductions to specific gamelan pieces. The Surakarta tradition is covered by Nojowirongko's Serat tuntunan padalangan (1954), which also forms the foundation of the account of sulukan in English given by Brandon. In the Surakarta tradition, only pathetan, sendhon and ada-ada are recognised as forms. A further distinction between types is between those accompanied by a small group an instruments including gendér, gambang, rebab and suling (such as lagon and suluk), and those accompanied by gender alone or with the addition of kempuls and gongs (such as kawin, sendhon and ada-ada).

== Naming conventions ==
All sulukan have a specific pathet designation relating both to the mode of the gamelan and the act of the wayang performance, many also have a functional specification relating to their role in the drama, which either specifies the scene in which they are used or their particular occasion. For example: Lagon Sl 9 wêtah tumrap badhe gara-gara - in this title Lagon is the type, Sl 9 specifies the mode as being slendro sanga, wêtah indicates the metre, and tumrap badhe gara-gara indicates its use at the opening of the gara-gara section which introduces the clowns (punokawan).

== Sulukan texts ==
The language of most sulukan in current use is not everyday Javanese. Instead it is a mixture of high Javanese (krama), literary Javanese and Kawi. The literary Javanese used in sulukan and many other literary forms differsm from spoken Javanese in three main ways: Firstly, the grammatical rules covering elements such as word order are relaxed - a practice known as baliswara; secondly, a large number of archaic words or phrases are used to create an atmosphere of "ancient wisdom", and finally the normal rules on speech levels (undha-usuk) may be relaxed, allowing the poet to choose a ngoko, krama, krama inggil or even Kawi version of a word to fit the metre in use, creating juxtapositions of speech levels unthinkable in normal discourse.

Most modern Javanese wayang audiences do not "understand" the texts of sulukan in the normal sense - although there are differences in levels of comprehension as there would be for an English-speaking audience at a Shakespeare play, for instance - but few see it as a problem, feeling that the archaic and obscurantist nature of the texts is appropriate to the atmosphere of "otherworldliness" which wayang tries to create. In any case, Javanese dalangs are clear that the function of sulukan is to set a mood rather than convey information.

== Dramaturgical function ==
Of the 55 sulukan listed in Mudjanattistomo, 50 are specified as having a particular scene-setting function. These are always indicated in the title by the Javanese word tumrap ("for"), and fall into five broad categories: sulukan used to introduce a scene, sulukan used to introduce a named character or generic character-type, sulukan presented as being sung by one of the punokawan, sulukan used within a scene to introduce a type of action - usually but not always a fight sequence, and sulukan attached to a specific gamelan piece by way of a vocal introduction.
