= Wayang beber =

Indonesian theatre

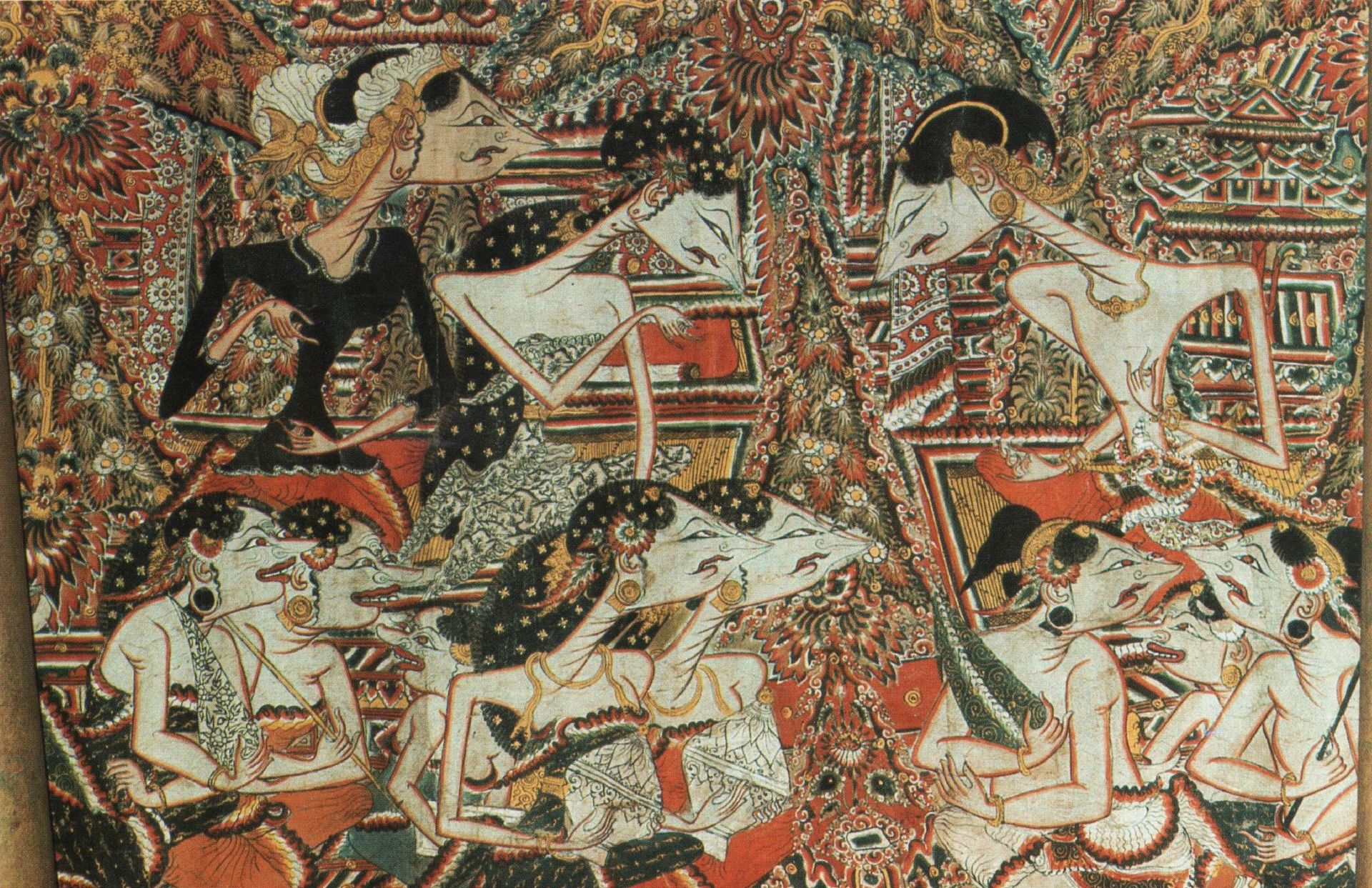
- Types: Traditional puppet theatre
- Ancestor arts: Javanese culture
- Originating culture: Indonesia
- Originating era: Hindu–Buddhist civilisations

Wayang puppet theatre
- UNESCO Intangible Cultural Heritage
- Country: Indonesia
- Reference: 00063
- Region: Asia and the Pacific

Inscription history
- Inscription: 2008 (3rd session)
- List: Representative
- Wayang kulit (the leather shadow puppet), wayang klitik (the flat wooden puppet), wayang golek (the three-dimensional wooden puppet)

Wayang beber (Javanese: ꦮꦪꦁꦧꦺꦧꦺꦂ, romanized: wayang bèbèr (in the ngoko register)) is an Indonesian wayang performance art whose presentation is manifested on stretched sheets of paper or cloth, with pictures in the stylized wayang accompanied by a narration by a dalang. Wayang beber performances emerged and developed in Java in pre-Islamic times but continued into the Islamic kingdoms (such as the Sultanate of Mataram). The stories shown are taken from the Mahabharata and the Ramayana. After Islam became the main religion in Java, more Panji tales were performed. Wayang beber bears a strong resemblance to narrative in the form of pictorial ballads common at annual fairs in medieval and early modern Europe. They too suffered the same fate—nearly becoming extinct, although there are still groups of artists who support wayang beber in places like Surakarta (Solo) in Central Java.

== History ==
The first foreign records of a wayang beber performance were reported by Ma Huan in his 1451 book, Yingya Shenglan, which tells of Zheng He's visit to Java in about 1413–1415, during the Majapahit empire, as well as by Fei Xin. They saw crowds of people listening to someone tell a story based on pictures displayed on a partially rolled sheet of paper. The storyteller would hold a piece of wood and use it to point to the pictures on the sheet. Such practices are still the same as wayang beber performances in later times.

The pictures of the wayang scenes are depicted on sheets of cloth, or deluwang, each containing several scenes (called (pe)jagong), according to the order of the story. The images are unfurled one by one, with the dalang, or puppeteer, narrating the depicted scenes, including dialogue.

== Today ==
In the present day, wayang beber is only performed in a few locations, such as Gelaran hamlet in Bejiharjo village, Karangmojo, Gunungkidul. The performance is a dying art, and few young people have learned it from the original dalang.

== See also ==
- Wayang kulit
- Wayang golek
- Nang yai, Thai equivalent
- Nang talung, Thai equivalent
