= Dalang (puppeteer) =

Puppeteer in Indonesian wayang performance

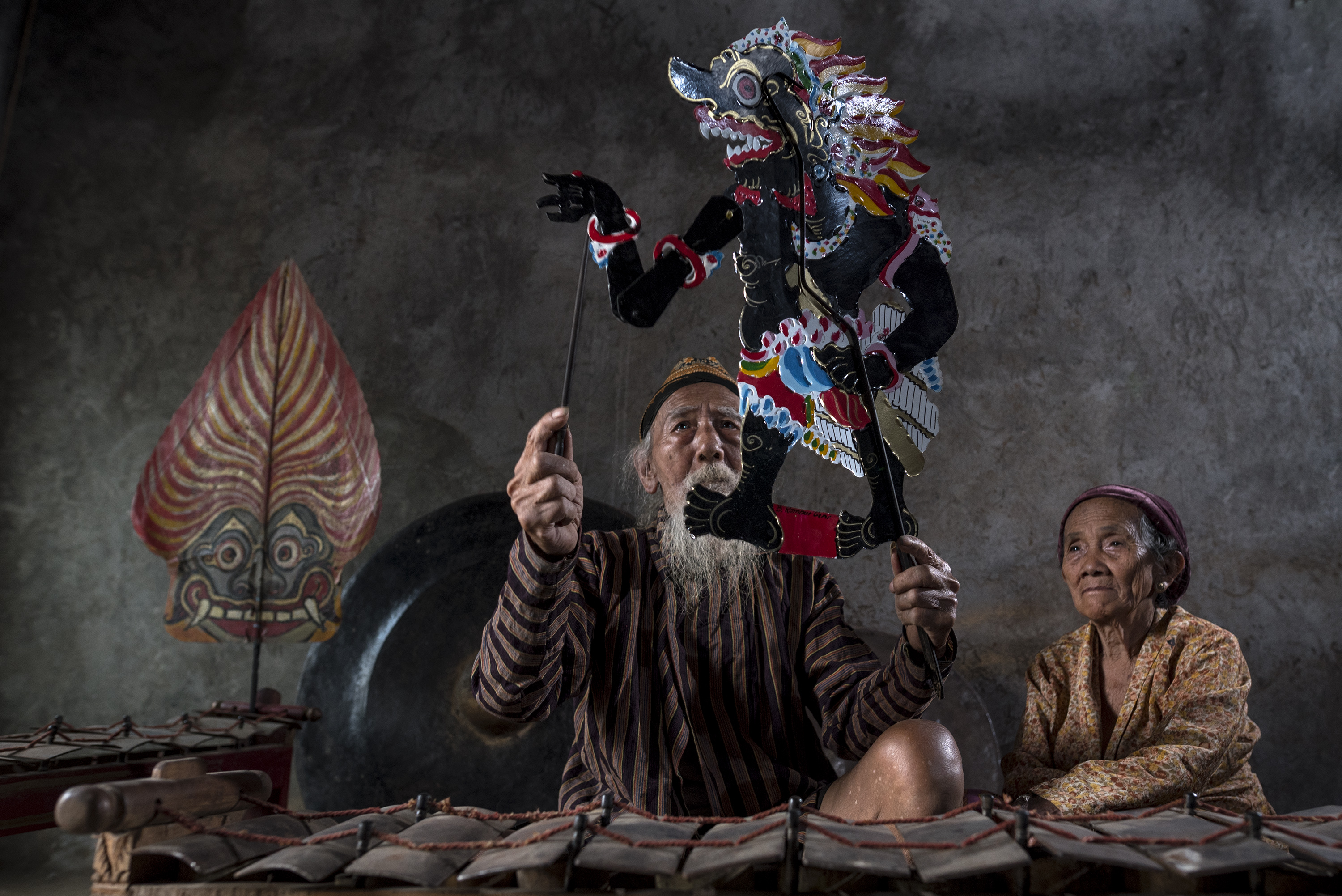
A dalang with a wayang kulit puppet

The dhalang or dalang (Javanese: ꦝꦭꦁ, romanized: dhalang; Indonesian: dalang) is the puppeteer in an Indonesian wayang performance.

In a performance of wayang kulit, the dalang sits behind a screen (ꦏꦼꦭꦶꦂ, kelir) made of white cotton stretched on a wooden frame. Above his head, hanging from beams attached to the top of the screen is the lamp (ꦧ꧀ꦭꦺꦚ꧀ꦕꦺꦴꦁ, bléncong), which projects the shadows onto the screen. In front of the dhalang is a stage (ꦒꦼꦢꦼꦧꦺꦴꦒ꧀, gedebog), traditionally made from the trunk of a banana tree, into which the sharpened control rods of the puppets can be pushed to keep them in position during the performance. To his left is the puppet chest (ꦏꦺꦴꦛꦏ꧀, kothak), and to his right is the puppet chest's lid, on which the puppets sit ready for use.

In addition to moving the puppets and speaking their lines, the dalang is also responsible for giving cues to the gamelan. This is done principally by playing the kepyak, a metal plate or set of plates played with his foot, or by rapping on the puppet chest (kothak) with a wooden mallet held in the left hand.

The art of puppetry (ꦥꦝꦭꦔꦤ꧀, padhalangan) was traditionally handed down within families, and dalangs formed a type of informal caste within Javanese society. The women of these families traditionally were expert players of the gendèr, an instrument that has a particularly important role in accompanying wayang performances. The sons of dalangs were often apprenticed out around the age of 13 to another dhalang. His role included helping to set up the screen ahead of a performance, performing the afternoon show before a main all-night wayang, and sometimes acting as an accompanying musician or as an assistant puppeteer. He would also frequently end up marrying his master's daughter, who would have been trained as a gendér player by her mother. The social aspects of the dalang caste are covered in Victoria Clara van Groenendael's book The Dalang Behind the Wayang (Dordrecht, 1985).

Much of the traditional training of dhalangs was in the form of a practical apprenticeship, with a certain amount of spiritual training thrown in. This included meditation and a form of ascetic exercise known as kungkum (ꦏꦸꦁꦏꦸꦩ꧀), in which meditation is carried out naked at night while immersed up to the neck in water. Such practices are felt to be essential in building up the stamina to perform for nine hours at a stretch. A further ascetic element is that dhalangs never eat during the performance, although almost all drink sweet tea and many also smoke heavily.

In recent times, however, schools teaching a standardized version of padhalangan have been founded, such as the Habirandha school within the Kraton Yogyakarta. The Habirandha school published its textbook, the Pedhalangan Ngayogyakarta, in 1976. Standardized padhalangan is also taught at Indonesian state institutions such as the Indonesian Institute of the Arts, Yogyakarta.

Padhalangan falls into three main areas - musical, vocal, and puppetry. The musical aspects include the direction and cueing of the gamelan and the singing of mood-setting songs (sulukan), the vocal includes the recitation of set texts at scene-openings (ꦏꦤ꧀ꦝ, kandha) and the extemporisation of dialogue showing mastery of Javanese linguistic etiquette, while the puppetry itself (ꦱꦧꦼꦠꦤ꧀, sabetan) involves a complex system of movements and positions. There is an extensive study of sabetan in English by Roger Long.

== See also ==
- Wayang
- Wayang kulit
- Sulukan
- Javanese culture
