= Evgenios Spatharis =

Greek shadow theatre artist (1924–2009)

- Born: 3 January 1924; Kifissia, Kingdom of Greece
- Died: 9 May 2009 (aged 85); KAT Hospital, Kifissia, Greece
- Occupation: Shadow theatre artist

Evgenios Spatharis (Greek: Ευγένιος Σπαθάρης; 3 January 1924 – 9 May 2009) was the most prominent shadow theatre artist in Greece. He is credited with having brought the traditional Karagiozis plays to mass audiences through television, recordings and cinema.

== Biography ==
Evgenios Spatharis was born on 3 January 1924, in Kifissia, son of Sotiris Spatharis, himself a famous puppeteer. He progressively got introduced to his father's art, despite his father's reluctance, since his wish was for Evgenios to become an architect. His first public performances were during the German occupation of Greece, when he frequently used heroic themes in order to strengthen the morale of the population. During one of his shows, the Germans arrested him and brought him to the local Kommandantur for interrogation. Using an old connection of his, he managed to perform for them and they were so impressed that they decided to send him to perform to Germany.

Besides being the most famous performer of Karagiozis, he was also an accomplished painter, with over 50 exhibitions of his works.

He has collaborated with many of the most important Greek artists, like Manos Hadjidakis, Dionysis Savvopoulos, Rallou Manou, Stavros Xarchakos, Melina Merkouri and others.

== Honorary memberships and awards ==
Spatharis was a member of the Chamber of Artists of Greece and the UNESCO International Theatre Institute. He was awarded the Rome Prize in 1962, the Toscanini medal in 1978 and several other awards, while in 2007 the Greek culture ministry awarded him the title of 'Grand Master' in recognition of his great contribution to his art.

== Death ==
Spatharis was invited to an event at the Athens Goethe Institut on Wednesday, 6 May, where he was scheduled to give a lecture. While heading to the lecture room, he fell from the stairs and had a severe head injury. He was immediately transported to KAT hospital; however, he never recovered and died the following Saturday, at the age of 85.

== Legacy ==
Especially in his last two decades, Spatharis enjoyed wide acclaim and respect as a towering figure of the Greek shadow theatre and of cultural life in general. His death caused a stream of encomia from critics, journalists and public figures.

He created the Spathario Museum in 1991, devoted exclusively to his art.
