= Brahala =

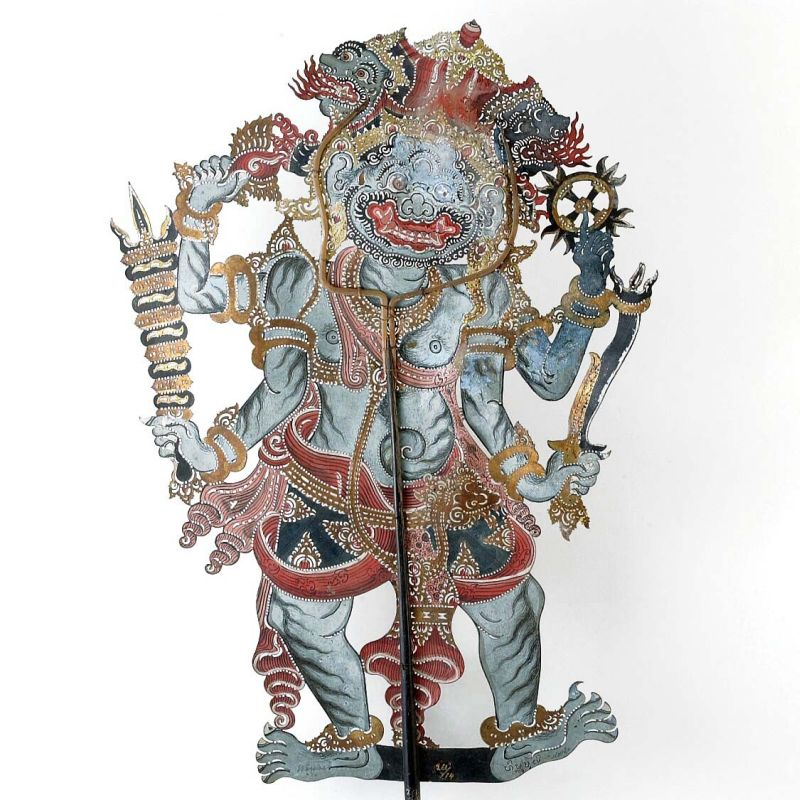
- The God Vishnu (Wisnu) transforms into a Brahala

Brahala is a giant from Indonesian mythology, the transformation of the God Vishnu while Vishnu's descendants perform the triwikrama ritual. In the arts of Indonesian shadow puppetry, Brahala is portrayed as a mountain-sized giant with a thousand heads and arms, each holding various kinds of weapons. described as having big frightening eyes. Brahala's name comes from the Javanese terms "Brah" and "Ala" meaning "scary face".

== Brahala in shadow puppet performance ==
Among Vishnu's descendants, Krishna and Arjuna are the ones who often do the triwikrama ritual. Some shadow puppeteers in the Purwa version often call Brahala "Brahala Sewu", especially if the ritual is done by Krishna. Puntdewa and Yudhishthira, while transformed into a Brahala, are called the Amral God. Among the group of shadow puppets, Brahala is placed in the last place of the back row, behind the other puppets. This shadow puppet character is told as being the transformation of holy characters and it is drawn out to perform when the character is doing a triwikrama ritual while being angry. Many shadow puppet craftsmen illustrate Brahala as a big and scary giant.
