= Spathario Museum =

Museum in Maroussi, Athens, Greece

Coordinates: 38°3′16″N 23°48′26.8″E

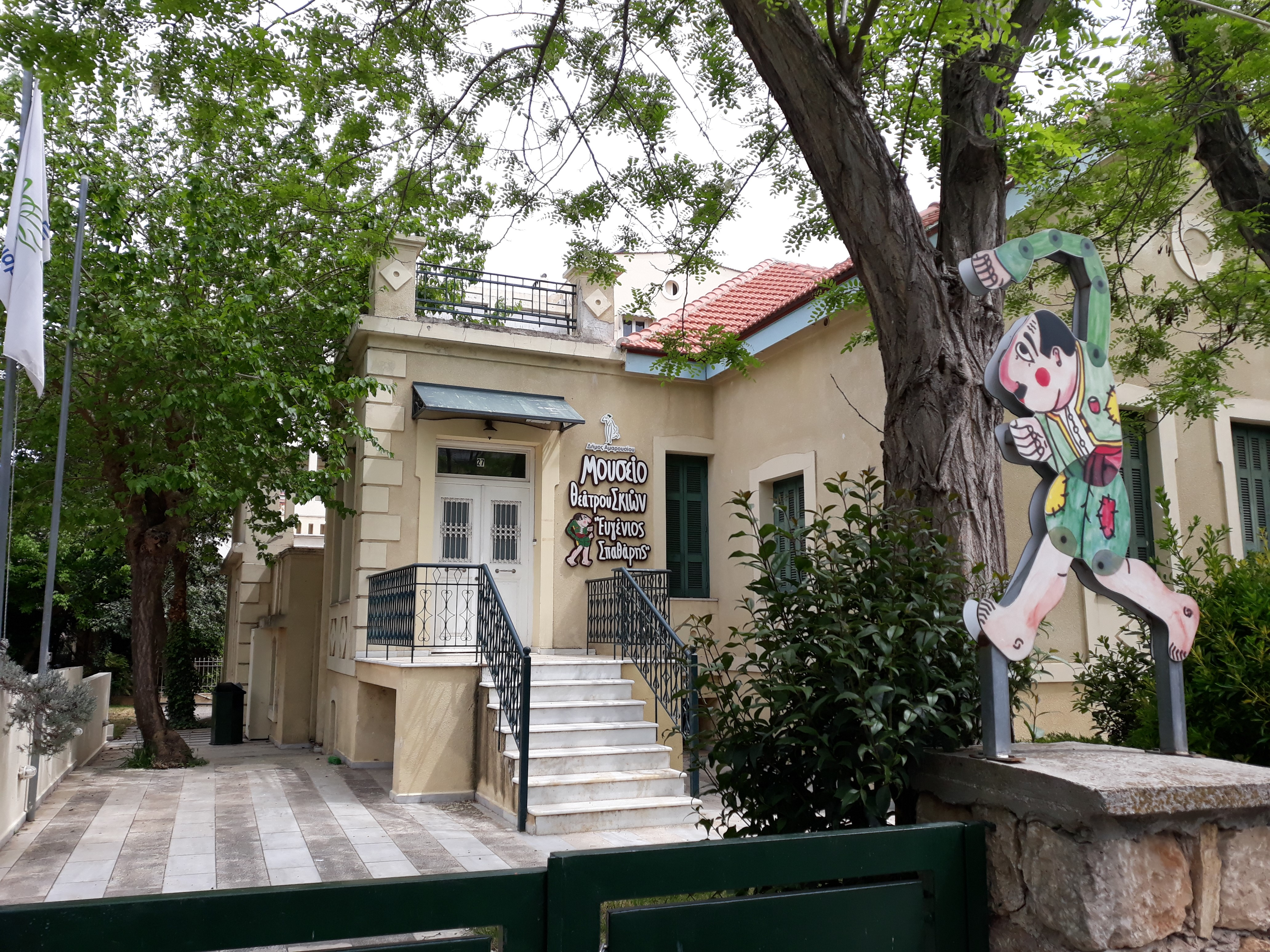
Exterior of the museum

The Spathario Shadow Theatre Museum is a museum in Maroussi, Athens, Greece. It exhibits mostly shadow puppet artifacts and it is named after prominent Greek puppet shadow artist Evgenios Spatharis. It was established in 1991 in the municipality of Maroussi and opened in 1996.

== History ==
The museum was established through the collaboration of Eugenios Spatharis and the Municipality of Amarousio. In 1991, the museum established its own public law legal entity under the name Spathario Museum of Shadow Theatre of the Municipality of Amarousio. That same year, the museum was formally established and its founders formed its Board of Directors. In May 1993, the first conference on Greek shadow theatre was held, and on 22 June 1995 the museum was officially opened in a renovated neoclassical building at Kastalias Square.

As the number of visitors continued to increase, a decision was made to expand the museum's facilities, convert its courtyard into a theatre for Karagiozis performances, and relocate the museum to a larger and more spacious privately owned neoclassical building in the city centre.

Every autumn, the annual Spatharia Festival is held outside the museum, featuring different performances by numerous Karagiozis performers, in memory of Eugenios Spatharis.

School trips and educational visits account for the largest proportion of the museum's visitors.

== See also ==
- Karagiozis
