= Karagöz (magazine) =

Satirical magazine in Turkey (1908–1955)

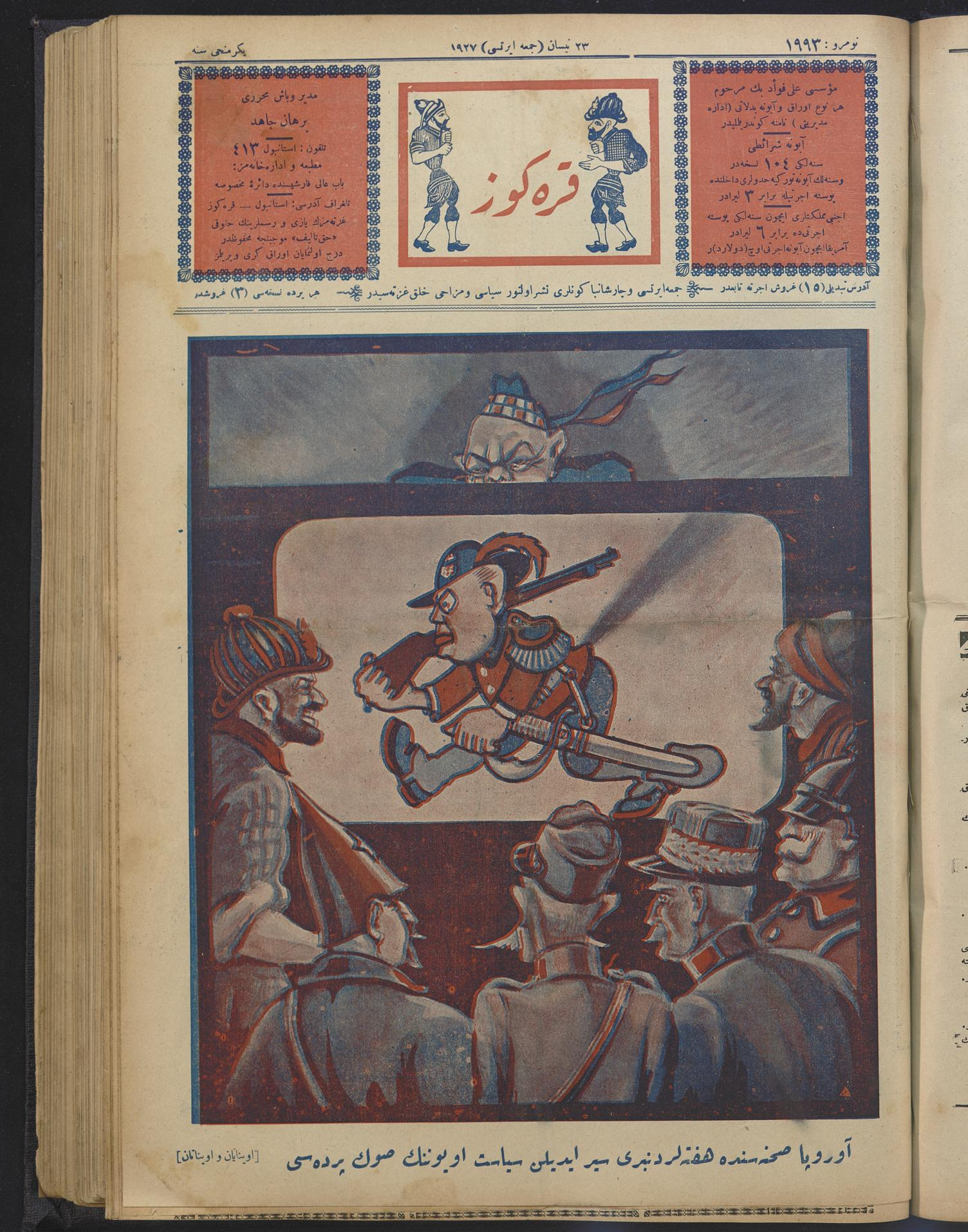
- Cover page of Karagöz issue 1993
- Categories: Satirical magazine
- Frequency: Twice a week
- Founder: Ali Fuad Bey
- Founded: 1908
- Final issue: 1955
- Country: Ottoman Empire; Turkey
- Based in: Istanbul
- Language: Ottoman Turkish; Turkish
- Website: Karagöz

Karagöz (Turkish: Black Eye; Ottoman Turkish: کاراگوز) was an Ottoman, later Turkish, satirical magazine published from 1908 to 1955 twice a week in Istanbul. Its title has its origin in one of the protagonists of the traditional Ottoman shadow play, who acted together with his friend Hacivat. Karagöz was a common person, well known for his sharp tongue and clear criticism of politics and society. Both of them appear on each front page of the magazine.

Among the numerous humorous magazines published since the pioneer Diyojen, Karagöz was prominent with its more than 40 years publication period. The scope of their historical and chronological documentation - from the Second Ottoman Constitutional Period, First World War, the Turkish War of Independence up to the founding of the Turkish Republic - is unique.

Ali Fuad Bey, the founder of the magazine, is considered to be the first Turkish cartoonist and was the publisher of numerous other magazines. In the first years' editions, all the cartoons were designed by Ali Fuad Bey himself, Mehmed Baha and Halil Naci. After Ali Fuad Bey's death in 1919, the well-known journalist Mahmud Sadık became editor-in-chief. Fuad's sister and heiress Fatma sold the magazine in 1935 to the Republican People's Party. One of the contributors of Karagöz during this period was Ratip Tahir Burak, a well-known Turkish cartoonist.

The articles of the magazine were written in a popular, easy to understand and humorous language. The numerous colored and black and white cartoons also offered a clear understanding of the political, social, economic and cultural events of the time. An issue consisted of four pages, the first of which was reserved for the dialogues between Karagöz and Hacivat (Muhavere) and was devoted to daily politics and everyday problems. The popular editorial "Karagözs Monologues" featured the relationship between man and woman, the lifestyle and the social conditions of women of Istanbul and the general women debates. Later, the publication of poems and lyrics was added.

Karagöz was one of the publications which featured a cartoon of Mustafa Kemal during the Turkish War of Independence. The cartoon was published in the magazine on 16 February 1921.
