= Karagiozis =

Fictional character and shadow puppet

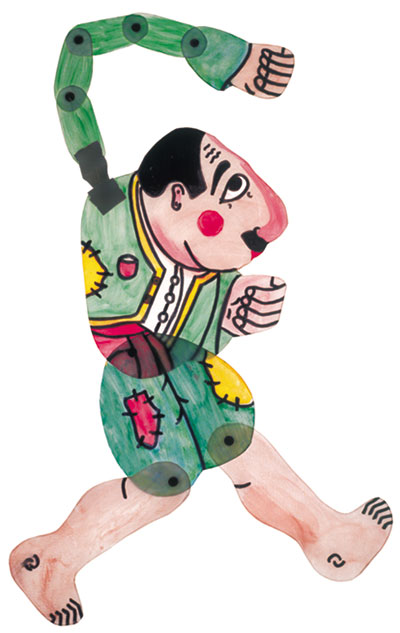
Karaghiozis (toy shadow puppet)

Karagiozis or Karaghiozis (Greek: Καραγκιόζης, Turkish: Karagöz [kaɾaˈɟœz]) is a shadow puppet and fictional character of Greek folklore. He is the main character of the traditional Greek shadow puppet theatre, which dates back to the Ottoman era. He is the Greek version of the Turkish character Karagöz, and is an important part of Greek cultural heritage. Karagiozis has influenced shadow puppet theatre in many regions.

== History ==
=== Origins: Java, China, or Mediterranean ===
Some believe that it originates from the island of Java (Indonesia) where shadow puppet shows called wayang kulit were played already as early as in the 11th century.

Shadow theatre, with a single puppeteer creating voices for a dialogue, narrating a story, and possibly even singing while manipulating puppets, appears to come ultimately from the Indonesian wayang kulit or Chinese pi ying xi.

There are several stories of how shadow theater was established in Asia Minor. Many argue for a Mediterranean origin in the Egyptian shadow puppet tradition.

=== Egypt and Ottoman Empire ===
Shadow theater arrived from the island of Java in today's Indonesia in the Ottoman Empire via traders. The first Karagöz–Hacivat play was performed for Sultan Selim I (reigned 1512–1520) in Egypt after his conquest of the country in 1517, but 17th century writer Evliya Çelebi stated that it had been performed in the Ottoman palace as early as the reign of Bayezid I (reigned 1389–1402). In the 16th century, Ottoman Grand Mufti Muhammad Ebussuud el-İmadi issued a celebrated opinion allowing the performance of Karagöz plays.

Whatever the origin, it is worthwhile to mention that regardless of religious restrictions, shadow theater became more widespread around the 16th century among the Muslim Turks.

Originally, his popular appeal was his scatological language and protruding phallus. It is still performed in Turkey, especially during Ramadan celebrations, under the same name, Karagöz.

=== Mainland Greece ===
The name Karagiozis or Karaghiozis is from Greek Καραγκιόζης, borrowed from Turkish Karagöz 'dark eye'.

Karagiozis seems to have come to mainland Greece, probably from Asia Minor (Anatolia) in the 19th century, during Ottoman rule. Karagiozis was hellenized in Patras, Greece in the end of 19th century by Dimitrios Sardounis, a.k.a. Mimaros, regarded as the founder of modern Greek shadow theater.

The genre became fully integrated, though adapted, amongst the Greek population. But there are several legends as well as studies surrounding Karagiozis's arrival and subsequent popularity in Greece. Some stories say that Greek merchants brought the art from China and others say that it was a Greek who created the "legend" during Ottoman rule for the entertainment of the sultan. Yet others believe that it originated from real events involving two masonry workers named Karagöz and Haci Ivat working in the construction of a mosque in the city of Bursa, Turkey in the early 14th century.

== Setting ==
Karagiozis is a poor hunchbacked Greek, his right hand is always depicted as particularly long, his clothes are ragged and patched, and he is always barefoot. He lives in a poor cottage (Greek: παράγκα) with his wife Aglaia and his three sons, during the times of the Ottoman Empire. The scene is occupied by his cottage on the left and the Sultan's Palace (Saray (building)) on the far right.

Because of his poverty, Karagiozis uses mischievous and crude ways to get money and feed his family.

Students of folklore divide Karagiozis' tales in two major categories: the 'Heroics' and the 'Comedies'. The Heroics are tales based on tradition or real stories involving the times under Ottoman rule, and Karagiozis is presented as a helper and assistant of an important hero.

Puppeteers devise their own original tales. However, there are many 'traditional' tales passed orally from earlier puppeteers and accepted as 'canon' with slight alterations among players. Most are formulaic and have the following layout, albeit with a wide improvisational variety, and often involve interaction with the audience:

1. Karagiozis appears in the scene with his three sons dancing and singing. He welcomes the audience and holds a comical dialogue with his children. He then announces the title of the episode and enters his cottage
2. The Vizier or a local Ottoman lord meets Hadjiavatis and reports that he has a problem and needs someone to perform a deed
3. Hadjiavatis obeys and starts announcing the news (usually a singing sequence) until Karagiozis hears about it
4. Initially annoyed by Hadjiavatis' shouting, he finds it's an opportunity to gain money (either by helping the Vizier or not) and sometimes asks Hadjiavatis to aid him.
5. Karagiozis either attempts to help the Vizier or fool him. The regular characters (see below) appear one at a time in the scene (they often appear with an introducing song which is standard for each of them); Karagiozis has a funny dialogue with them, mocks them, fools them, or becomes annoyed and ousts them violently.
6. Finally, Karagiozis is either rewarded by the Vizier or his mischief is revealed and he is punished - usually by the Vizier's bodyguard, Veligekas.
7. At the end Hadjiavatis appears on the screen and, together with Karagiozis, they announce the end of the show.

Some of the best known tales include:

- Alexander the Great and the accursed snake
- The wedding of Barba Giorgos
- Karagiozis the doctor
- Karagiozis the cook
- Karagiozis the senator
- Karagiozis the scholar
- Karagiozis the fisherman
- Karagiozis and the gorilla
- Karagiozis and the ghost

== The characters ==
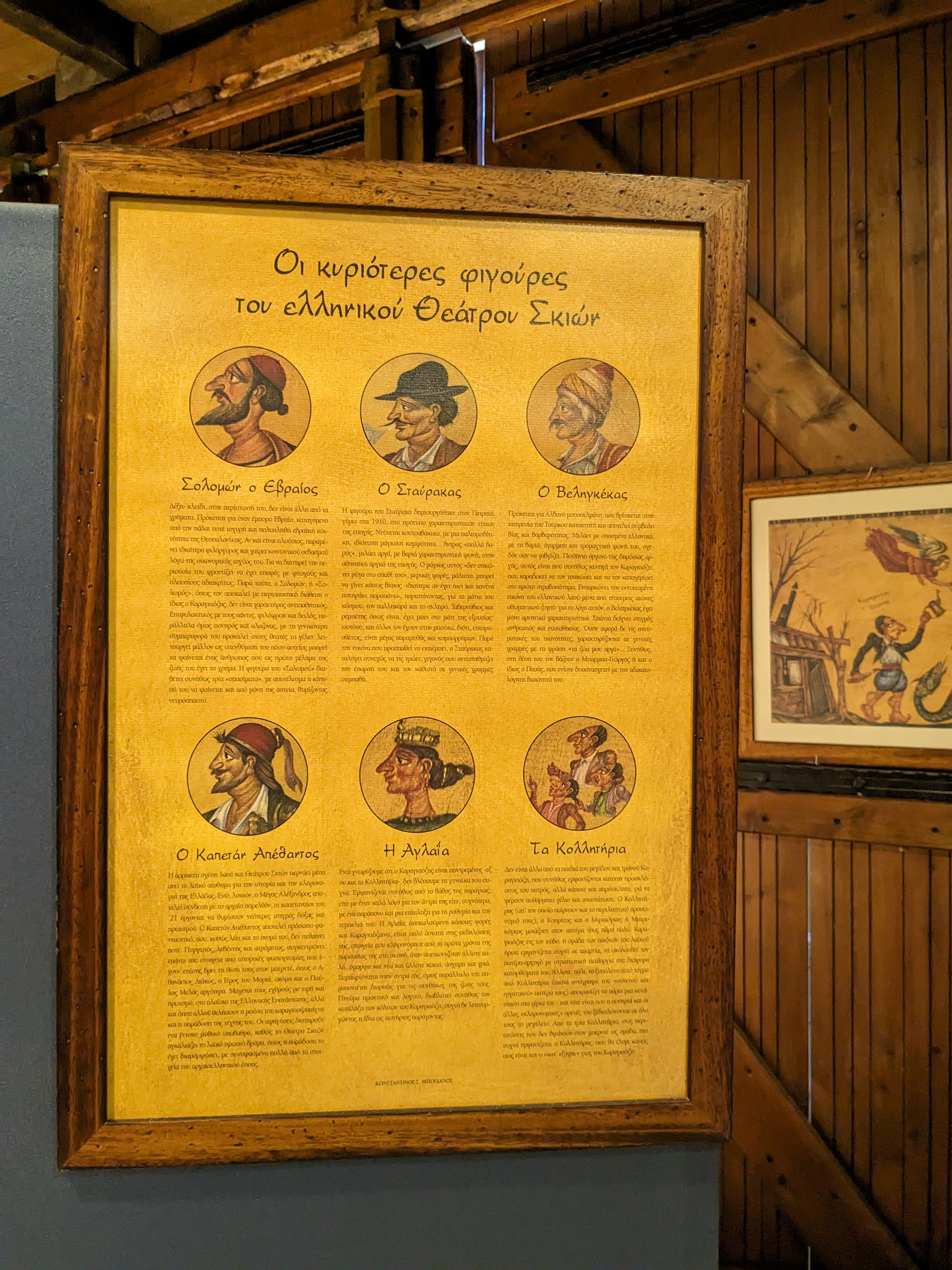
A selection of characters of Greek Shadow Puppetry, not including Karagiozis

- Karagiozis (Καραγκιόζης), (last name : Karagiozopoulos) is a trickster and a poor Greek man whose sole interests are sleeping and eating. Socially, he is in closer relation to Hadji Ivat (Greek: Hadjiavatis) than any other characters, who typically serves as his informant. Sometimes they cooperate in business, but sometimes Hadjiavatis is a victim of Karagiozis' tricks.
- The Kollitiria (Τα Κολλητήρια), Karagiozis' three kids. Some versions give their names as (from older and taller to younger and shorter) Kollitiris, the smart one; Kopritis, the dumb one (a.k.a. Svouras or Skorpios); and Mirigokos, the naive one (a.k.a. Birikogos or Pitsikogos).
- Aglaia, (Αγλαΐα) Karagiozis' wife, is usually unseen, but whose characteristically nagging voice is often heard to be coming from inside Karagiozis's house.
- Hadjiavatis (Χατζηαβάτης), (the Turkish counterpart is Hacivat) is Karagiozis' childhood friend and sidekick, an honest and serious figure. He often ends up being wrapped up in Karagiozis' schemes. He has a tendency to flatter the powerful and is sometimes depicted as a compliant person towards the occupying and dominant establishment, in contrast to Karagiozis' anti-establishment behavior.
- Barba Giorgos (Μπάρμπα Γιώργος, "Uncle George") represents a pastoralist and stereotypical yokel from the mountains of Rumeli, Central Greece, depicted as a shepherd or dairy farmer, usually on some business related to visiting the lowlands; he is sturdily built and wears the traditional fustanella kilted outfit, a pleated skirt-like garment. According to the folklorist Ioanna Papantoniou, the fustanella ultimately originated from the Celtic kilt, as viewed by the Roman legions, serving as the original prototype of this style. Even though Giorgos understands his nephew (Karagiozis) to be a crook, he sometimes helps him out and beats all the opponents black and blue with his staff.
- Stavrakas (Σταύρακας), (real name: Stavros), whose puppet is the only one with a long independent arm, like Karagiozis. He represents the "mangas", a member of the Belle Époque-era counterculture of Greece (especially of the great urban centers of Athens and Piraeus). The nearest English equivalents to the term "mangas" is wide boy, spiv or chav. Although Stavrakas tries to bully the others, Karagiozis normally teases him. Stavrakas is an arrogant blusterer that always gets beaten up by others. He often refers to Karagiozis as his "pal" and always carries worry beads (Greek: komboloi). Though worry beads were typically used as a relaxation technique in Greek culture, they were also symbos of power and social prestige. This was especially true in the case of expensive worry beads, which made of silver or amber.
- Sior Dionysios (Σιορ Διονύσιος), nicknamed "Nionios", is an Italianized gentleman from Zakynthos with pretensions of descent from nobility. Faithful to his Ionian Islands origin, he sings cantades (romantic serenades) and speaks the Ionian Greek dialect with the telltale accent.
- Morfonios (Μορφονιός), a vain and westernized dandy whose name in Greek means "Handsome". However, in fact, Morfonios is particularly ugly,having a huge head and a very large nose; still, he considers himself to be handsome and keeps falling in love. He often exclaims a sound like "whit!" He is also known for being a typical "momma's boy" and for calling Karagiozis a "fathead".
- Solomon (Σολομών), a usually rich Jew from Thessaloniki, one of the less known characters, he speaks in his own fashion, sometimes uttering a very fast repeating sound often compared to a Gatling gun, earning him, by Karagiozis, the nickname "heavy arms", despite his frail build. His personality can vary, but he usually plays minor roles in the plot. Solomone is a typical cheapskate and serves as Karagiozis' landlord. He also has the ability of twisting his long neck in a comical way.
- Vizier (Βεζύρης), also called Pasha (Πασάς) in some versions, he is the dominant figure of the Ottoman government and lives in the Saray. He is usually the beginning of each new tale, by announcing trials, deeds, tests, etc., in which Karagiozis decides to become involved.
- Fatme (Φατμέ) is the Vizier or Pasha's beautiful daughter, playing either obedient or rebellious roles. The young woman has more than one way of causing trouble, sometimes for good purposes, in opposition to her despotic father; or, in mischief, out of dislike for Karagiozis or some other hero.
- Veligekas (Βελιγκέκας), an Albanian guard of the Saray. He is the executive arm of the Pasha, always on the lookout for Karagiozis and never wastes an opportunity to give him a good thrashing. Usually, however, he gets beaten in turn by Barba Giorgos.
- Peponias (Πεπόνιας, "Melon-Shaped"), (real name : Halil), a fat Turkish officer of the Saray, known for his big ego and cowardice, he replaces Veligekas in some versions.

Some players have further introduced more characters, such as Karagiozis' old father, or Stavrakas' friend, Nondas.

== The puppets ==
All the figures that represent the characters of the shows are two dimensional and designed always in profile. They were traditionally made from camel skin, carved to allow light through the image, creating details, but are today most often made of cardboard.

Traditional puppets gave off black shadows against the white screen, but some more recent puppets have holes covered with colored silk or plastic gel materials to create colored shadows. The torso, waist, feet and sometimes the limbs, were separate pieces that were joined together with pins. Most figures were composed of two parts (torso and legs) with only one joint to the waist. Two characters, Solomon and Morfonios had joints in the neck, and had a flexible head.

The puppets were moved with a stick attached to their 'back', except in the case of the figure of Karagiozis, Stavrakas and a few other characters whose arms or other limbs required separate movement. The 'scene' was a vertical white parapet, usually a cloth, called mperntes (from Turk. 'perde', curtain). Between the figures and the player (who was invisible), were candles or lamps that shed light to the figures and made their silhouettes and colours visible to the audience through the cloth.

== Modern incarnations ==
Conrad, also known as Karaghiosis, the protagonist of Roger Zelazny's ...And Call Me Conrad (also known as This Immortal), which won the 1966 Hugo Award for Best Novel, is partially inspired by this character.

In Greek daily speech, the name Karagiozis is also used as an insult more or less like clown. Puppeteers complain about this, saying that while Karagiozis can be violent, mischievous, a liar, and an antihero, he is also good-natured and faithful, so his name should not be used as an insult.

During the 1980s, Greek Television had Karagiozis shows on a weekly basis. These shows had more modern and educational themes, like for example Karagiozis living some myths of Greek mythology or visiting the moon and other planets. Some of these episodes were either live with an audience, or filmed especially for the TV show and contained scenes that required editing or special effects.

There have been several recent attempts to make Karagiozis incarnations in comic books. Since the 2000s, Karagiozis is not so popular as a choice of recreation for young kids and the number of puppeteers has diminished, but remains a significant and well known folkloric figure. Today, he is performed mostly in folk feasts or festivals and on national Greek television. There are also occasional tours in the Greek diaspora.

== See also ==
- Karagöz and Hacivat, the Turkish prototype
- Punch and Judy, an English puppet show
- Spathario Museum, museum dedicated to Karagiozis named after Eugenios Spatharis

== Sources ==
- Skafidas, Michael (2009). "Fabricating Greekness: From Fustanella to the Glossy Page". In Paulicelli, Eugenia; Clark, Hazel (eds.). The Fabric of Cultures: Fashion, Identity, and Globalization. New York and Oxford: Taylor & Francis (Routledge). pp. 145–163. ISBN 978-1-135-25356-1.
