= Sunny Seki =

American writer, artist, and photographer (born 20th century)

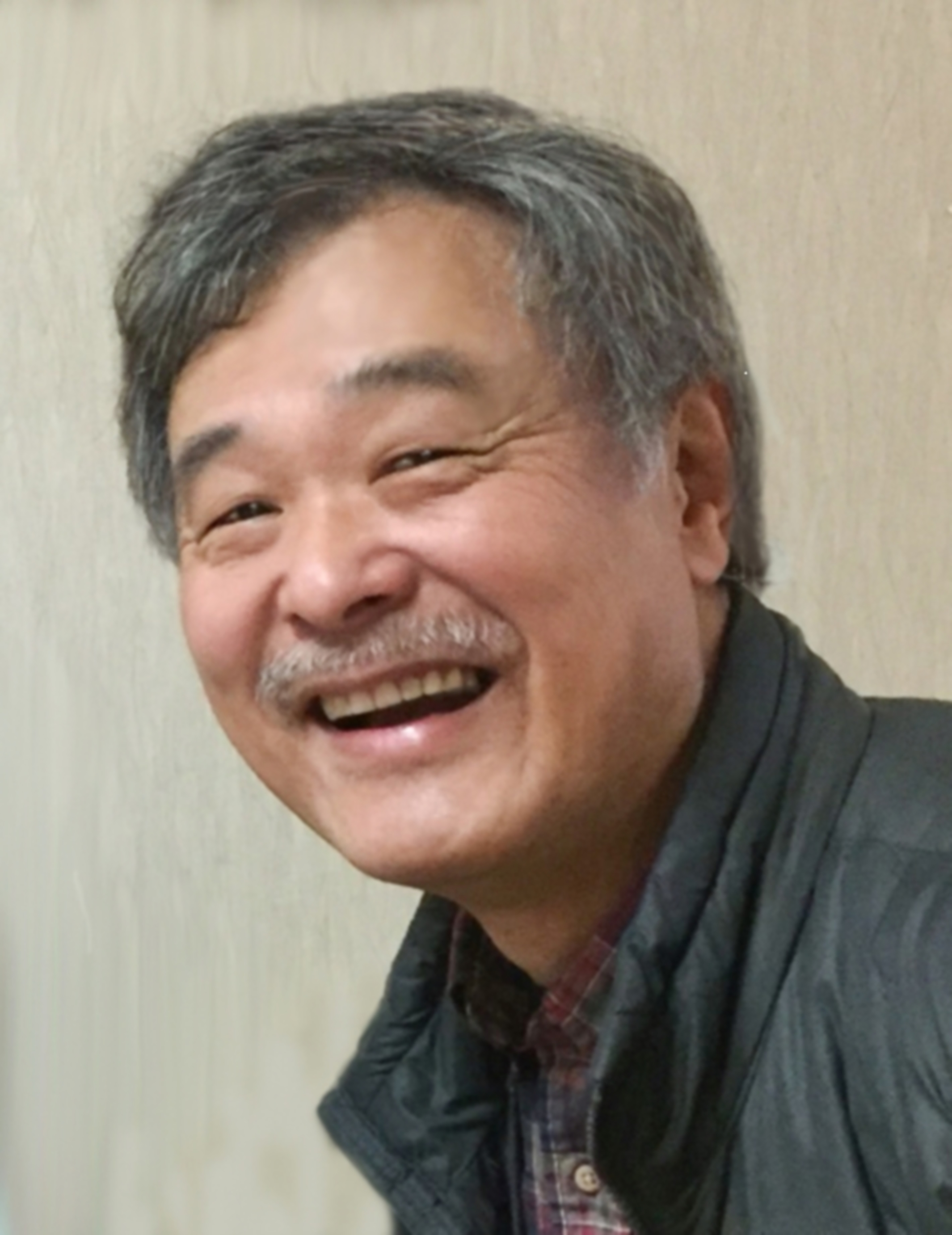
- Born: 20th century Tokyo, Japan
- Occupations: Illustrator, photographer, puppeteer, writer
- Website: sunnyseki.com

Sunny Seki (born 20th century) is a Japanese–born American writer, illustrator, and photographer, based in Los Angeles, California. He was born and raised in Tokyo, Japan, before moving to the United States at age 24. Seki is known for his cross-cultural bilingual children's books, with a focus on Japanese folktales.

== Education ==
Seki received his bachelor's degree in photography from Nihon University and also attended Kuwasawa Design School, and Pasadena's ArtCenter College of Design. He holds a Black Belt in the Japanese martial art of Aikido.

== Photography ==
From 1979 to 2006, Seki and his wife operated a photography studio in Rosemead, California. Called Sunny Seki Photography, it specialized in portraits, weddings, and restoring old photographs. Seki received several awards for his photography as listed below:

- 1985 – first place in the Wedding Photographers International competition (now known as WPPI)
- 1988 – selected as campaign photographer for Wedding Photographers International
- 1986 – first place designing the logo for PPLAC (Professional Photographers of Los Angeles)
- 1997 – first place designing the logo for PPC (Professional Photographers of California)
- 2002 – first place in a photo contest hosted by the city of Pasadena, California

== Children's books ==
=== The Tale of the Lucky Cat (2007) ===
Seki's first book, The Tale of the Lucky Cat, was published by East West Discovery Press. This book received two distinct awards: The "NAPPA Honors" National Parenting Publications Honor Award in 2007, and in 2009, the Creative Child Magazine "Preferred Choice" Award.

=== The Last Kappa of Old Japan (2010) ===
Seki's second book, The Last Kappa of Old Japan, A Magical Journey of Two Friends was published by Tuttle Publishing.

=== Yuko-Chan and the Daruma Doll (2012) ===
Seki's third book, Yuko-Chan and the Daruma Doll was released in February 2012, and it is a story about the adventures of a blind Japanese girl who saves her village. This book is bilingual, printed with both Japanese and English text. Yuko-chan and the Daruma Doll received the "2012 Book of the Year" award for storybooks on learning foreign cultures, sponsored by Creative Child Magazine, a national bi-monthly publication. Seki's book was also chosen for the "2012 Spirit of PaperTigers Book Set", which sends a set of four books to schools and libraries around the world. In 2016, Yuko-chan and the Daruma Doll was presented in a choreographed production by the Valley Dance Ensemble in Logan, Utah. Also in 2016, this book was chosen by Early Childhood Education Degrees as one of the 50 Best Books on Special Education. It was also named by the Perkins School for the Blind as one of the 25+ Children's Books Featuring Visually Impaired Characters.

=== The Little Kokeshi Doll from Fukushima (2015) ===
Seki's fourth book, The Little Kokeshi Doll from Fukushima, was released in February 2015, and it is a story about the possible origin of the traditional Kokeshi doll. The story is bilingual, printed in both English and Japanese text.

=== Hokusai's Daughter: A Young Artist in Old Japan (2024) ===
Seki's fifth book, Hokusai's Daughter, was to be published by Tuttle on October 8, 2024, and it is a story about Eijo, the daughter of the famous artist Hokusai. Because she was a girl, she received little recognition, but in modern times she is being lauded for her great works. This bilingual book won the Creative Child Magazine's Book of the Year Award.

== Puppetry ==
Seki is a former member of the Los Angeles Guild of Puppetry, where he learned to retell Japanese folktales in the form of shadow puppetry.

== Senryu ==
Seki is a coordinator and writer of Japanese poetry called Senryu, and his poems are often featured in the Japanese newspaper called The Rafu Shimpo and Discover Nikkei. As an illustrator, Seki's artwork has been featured on the front page of The Rafu Shimpo newspaper's New Year's Edition since 2012. In 2007, Seki wrote Gardeners' Pioneer Story, a compilation of gardeners' poems and historical commentary, and this work was recognized and honored by the Southern California Gardeners Federation. Seki is the teacher and director of the Los Angeles-based Rasshin Senryu group.

== Appearances ==
- In 2009, Seki was featured as "Puppeteer Dad" alongside his wife, Judy, and son, Mario, in a Disney Channel show called What a Life!
- Seki has also been introduced on national Japanese television programs such as Sekai no Mura no Doerai-san.
- Seki's children's books are included in the collections of Japan National Diet Library and the Japanese American National Library.
- In November 2021, Seki was featured in a children's television program on BBC called The Dengineers. In Series 6, episode 10, Seki explains the story of the Lucky Cat to a boy interested in building a Lucky Cat Den.
