= Shadow play =

Ancient form of storytelling

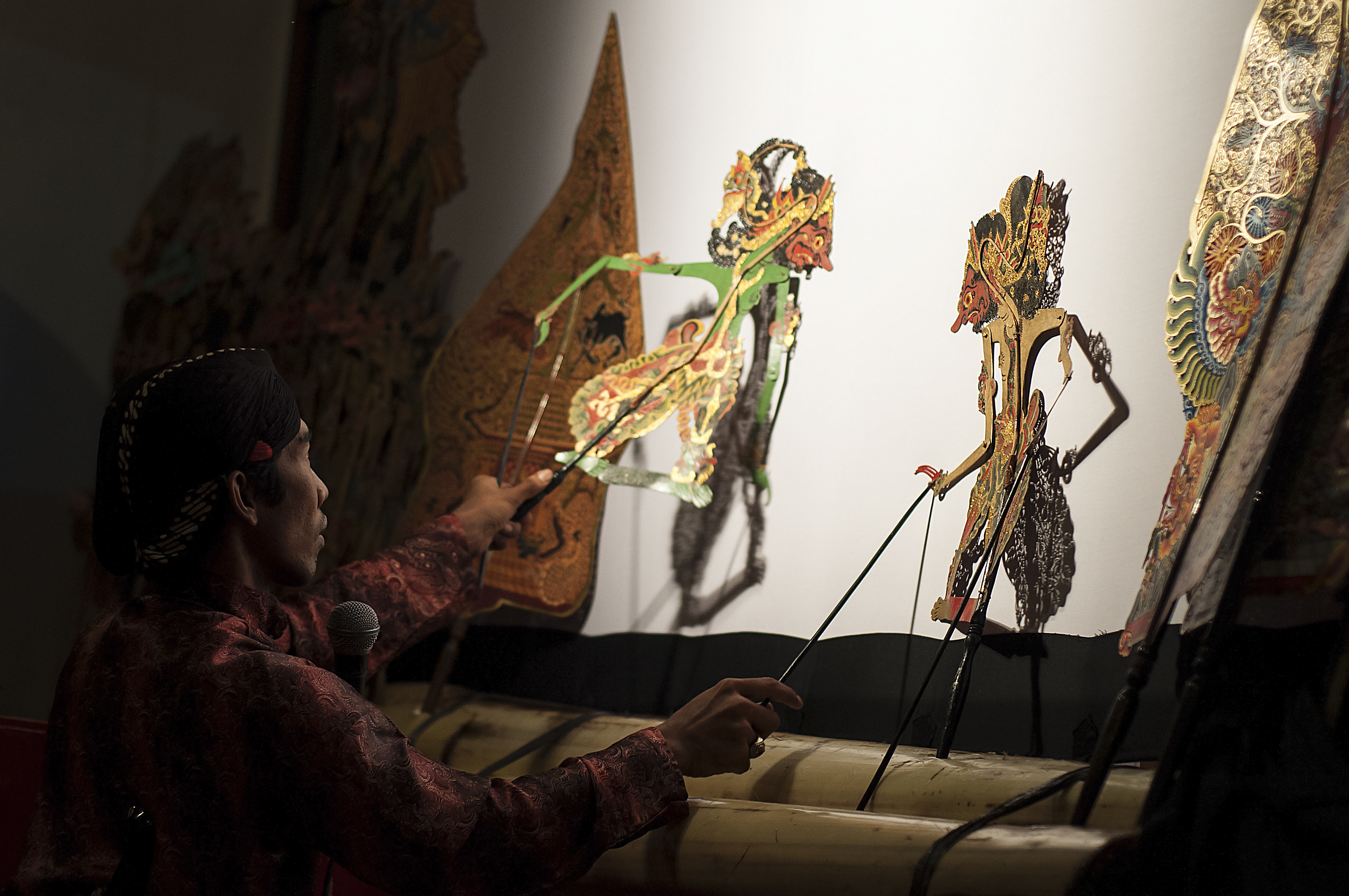
A performance of wayang, an Indonesian shadow puppet form

Shadow play, also known as shadow puppetry, is an ancient form of storytelling and entertainment which uses flat articulated cut-out figures (shadow puppets) which are held between a source of light and a translucent screen or scrim. The cut-out shapes of the puppets sometimes include translucent color or other types of detailing. Various effects can be achieved by moving both the puppets and the light source. A skilled puppeteer can make the figures appear to walk, dance, fight, nod and laugh.

There are four different types of performances in shadow play: the actors using their bodies as shadows, puppets where the actors hold them as shadows in the daytime, spatial viewing, and viewing the shadows from both sides of the screen.

Shadow play is popular in various cultures, among both children and adults in many countries around the world. More than 20 countries are known to have shadow show troupes. Shadow play is an old tradition and is listed as a Syrian intangible cultural heritage by UNESCO. It also has a long history in Southeast Asia, especially in Indonesia, Malaysia, Thailand, and Cambodia. It has been an ancient art and a living folk tradition in China, India, Iran and Nepal. It is also known in Egypt, Turkey, Greece, Germany, France, and the United States.

== History ==
Shadow play probably developed from "par" shows with narrative scenes painted on a large cloth and the story further related through song. As the shows were mostly performed at night the par was illuminated with an oil lamp or candles. Shadow puppet theatre likely originated in Central Asia-China or in India in the 1st millennium BCE. By at least around 200 BCE, the figures on cloth seem to have been replaced with puppetry in Indian tholu bommalata shows. These are performed behind a very thin screen with flat, jointed puppets made of colourfully painted transparent leather. The puppets are held close to the screen and lit from behind, while hands and arms are manipulated with attached canes and lower legs swinging freely from the knee.

The evidence of shadow puppet theatre is found in both old Chinese and Indian texts. The most significant historical centres of shadow play theatre have been China, Southeast Asia and the Indian subcontinent.

According to Martin Banham, there is little mention of indigenous theatrical activity in the Middle East between the 3rd century CE and the 13th century, including the centuries that followed the Islamic conquest of the region. The shadow puppet play, states Banham, probably came into vogue in the Middle East after the Mongol invasions and thereafter it incorporated local innovations by the 16th century. Little mention of shadow play is found in the Islamic literature of Iran, but much is found in Turkish and 19th-century Ottoman Empire-influenced territories.

While shadow play theatre is an Asian invention, hand puppets have a long history in Europe. As European merchant ships sailed in the search of sea routes to India and China, they helped diffuse popular entertainment arts and cultural practices into Europe. Shadow theatre became popular in France, Italy, Britain and Germany by the 17th century. In France, shadow play was advertised as ombres chinoises, while elsewhere they were called "magic lantern". Goethe helped build a shadow play theatre in Tiefurt in 1781.

=== Prelude to cinematography ===
According to Stephen Herbert, the popular shadow theatre evolved nonlinearly into projected slides and ultimately into cinematography. The common principle in these innovations were the creative use of light, images and a projection screen. According to Olive Cook, there are many parallels in the development of shadow play and modern cinema, such as their use of music, voice, attempts to introduce colours and mass popularity.

== By country and region ==
=== Australia ===
Richard Bradshaw is an Australian shadow puppeteer known for his characters like "Super Kangaroo". Bradshaw's puppetry has been featured in television programs made by Jim Henson as well as the long-running ABC children's TV series Play School.

The Shadow Theatre of Anaphoria (relocated to Australia from California) combines a mixture of reconstructed and original puppets with multiple sources of lights. The company is under the direction of Kraig Grady.

Australian company Shadowplay Studios' debut game Projection: First Light was inspired by shadow puppetry and its art style replicates the traditional shadow play canvas using black props and sepia backgrounds. They visited Richard Bradshaw to gain more insight into shadow puppetry, to make their game more authentic and to get references for the game's shadow puppet characters.

=== Sinosphere ===
==== China ====
Chinese shadow puppetry
- UNESCO Intangible Cultural Heritage
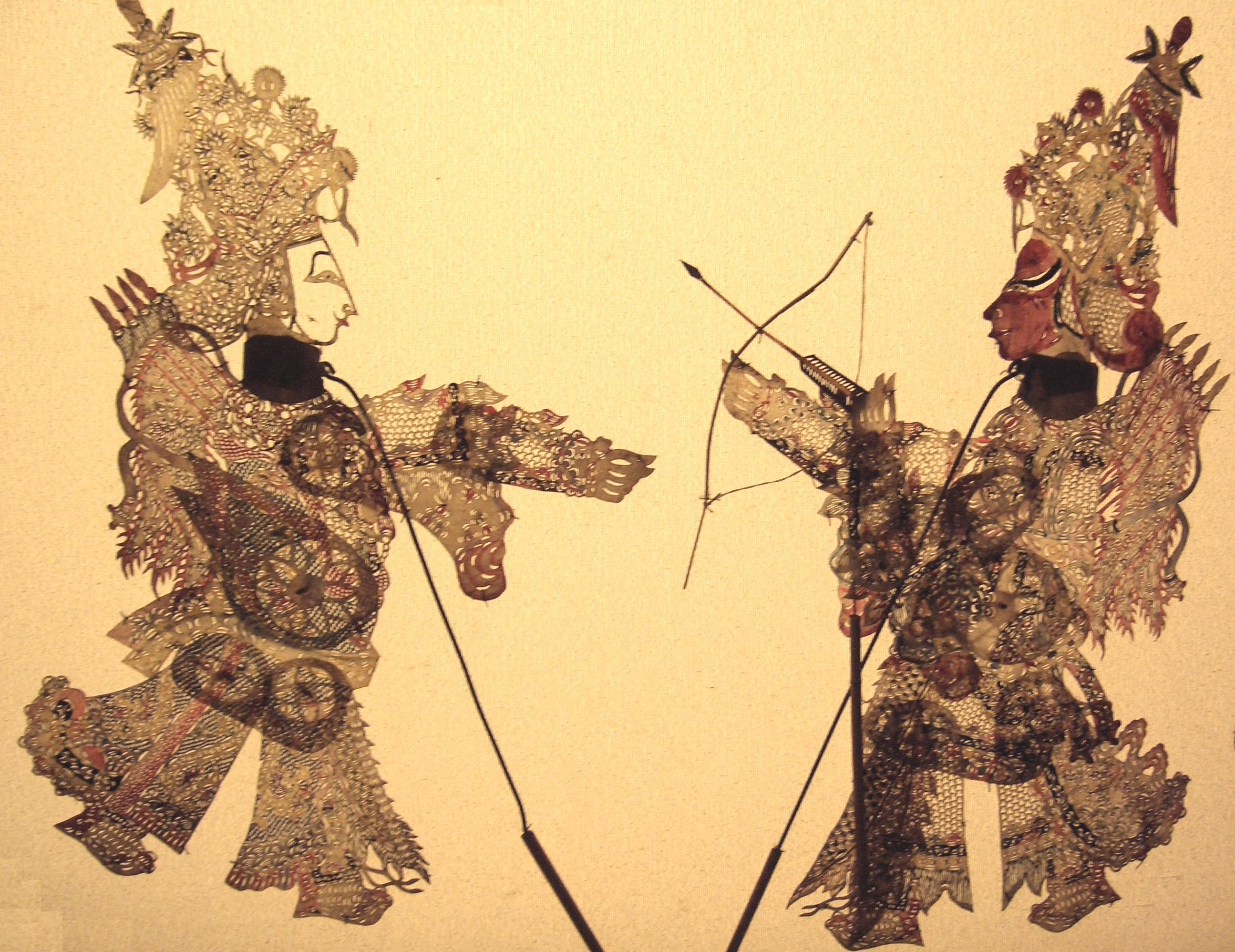
- Country: China
- Reference: 421
- Region: Asia and the Pacific

Inscription history
- Inscription: 2011 (6th session)
- List: Representative
- UNESCO Cultural Heritage

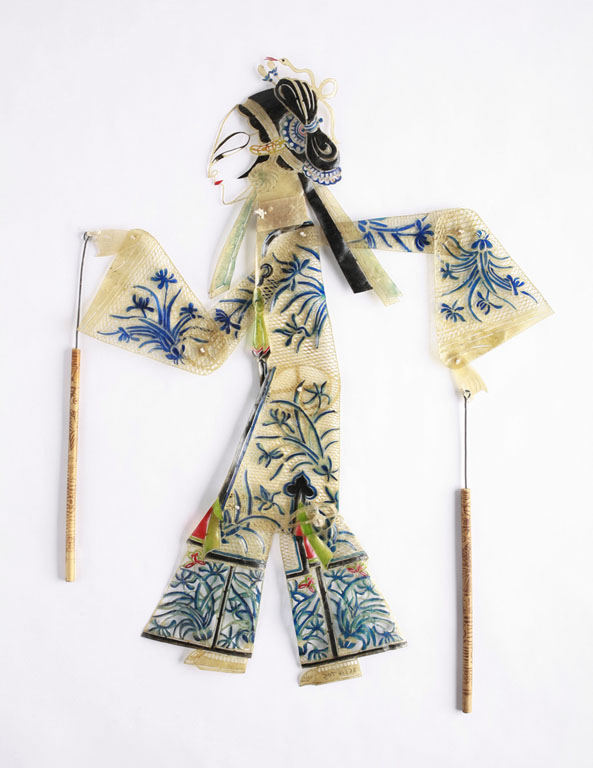
This Chinese shadow puppet is illustrative of the ornate detail that goes into the figures. From the collection of The Children's Museum of Indianapolis.

There are several myths and legends about the origins of shadow puppetry in China. The most famous one has it that Chinese shadow puppetry originated when the favorite concubine of Emperor Wu of Han (156 BCE – 87 BCE) died and magician Shao-weng promised to raise her spirit. The emperor could see a shadow that looked like her move behind the curtains that the magician had placed around some lit torches. It is often told that the magician used a shadow puppet, but the original text in Book of Han gives no reason to believe in a relation to shadow puppetry. Although there are many earlier records of all kinds of puppetry in China, clear mention of Chinese shadow play does not occur until the Northern Song dynasty (960–1127). A 1235 book mentions that the puppets were initially cut out of paper, but later made of colored leather or parchment. The stories were mostly based on history and half fact half fiction, but comedies were also performed.

Shadow play in China is called 皮影戲; píyǐngxì; 'skin shadow theatre'. There are two distinct styles of shadow play: Luanzhou (North China) and Sichuan (South China). Within Sichuan, there are two styles: Chuanbei piyingxi (Northern Sichuan) and Chengdu piyingxi. Cities that are included in the Northern Sichuan are Bazhong, Nanchong, and Guangyuan.

Shadow theatre became quite popular as early as the Song dynasty, when holidays were marked by the presentation of many shadow plays. During the Ming dynasty there were 40 to 50 shadow show troupes in the city of Beijing alone. The earliest shadow theatre screens were made of mulberry paper. The storytellers generally used the art to tell events between various war kingdoms or stories of Buddhist sources. Today, puppets made of leather and moved on sticks are used to tell dramatic versions of traditional fairy tales and myths. In regions such as Shaanxi, Shandong, Gansu, and Sichuan, young apprentices learn to carve shadow puppets from ox hide using traditional tools like half-moon knives and fine awls, preserving both craftsmanship and performance through hands-on practice. In Gansu province, it is accompanied by Daoqing music, while in Jilin, accompanying Huanglong music forms some of the basis of modern opera.

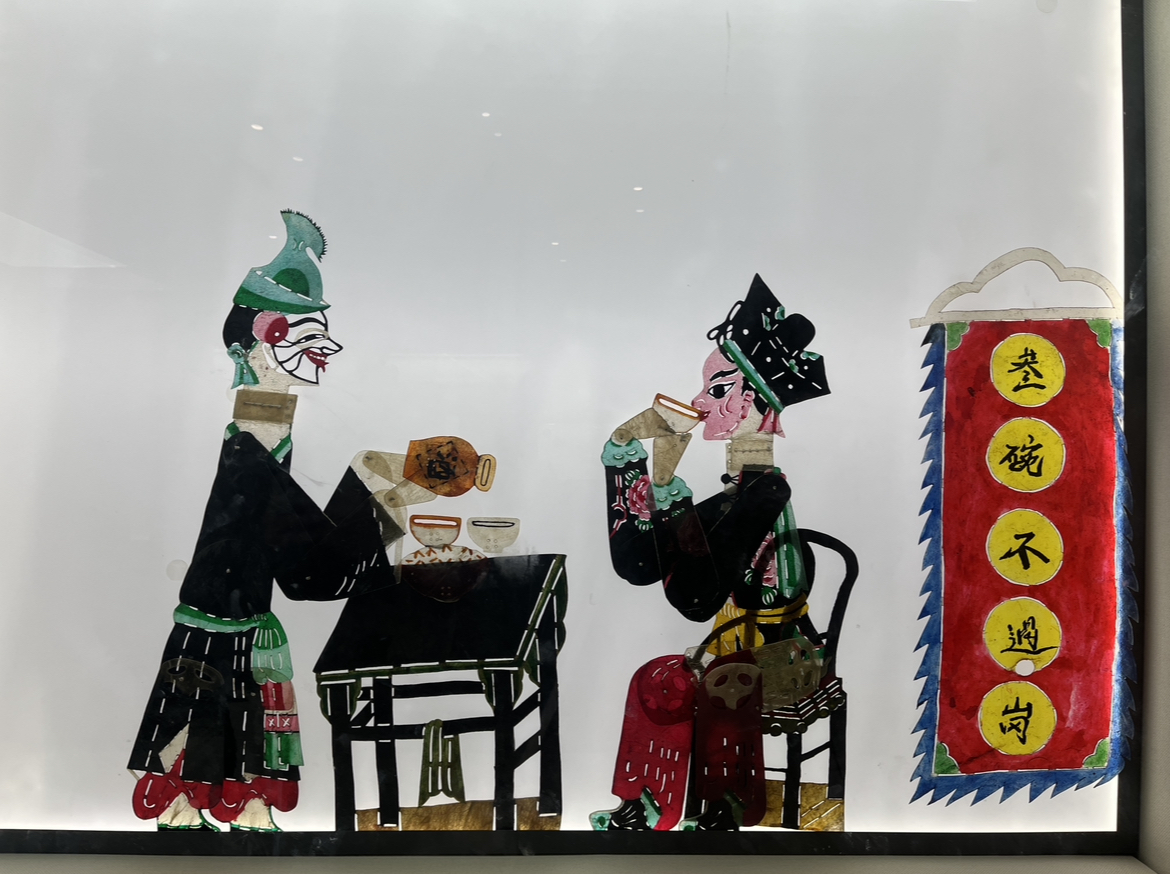
Chinese shadow puppetry is a form of theater whereby colorful silhouette figures perform traditional plays against a back-lit cloth screen, accompanied by music. From Kaifeng Prefecture.

Chinese shadow puppetry is shown in the 1994 Zhang Yimou film To Live.

==== Taiwan ====
The origins of Taiwan's shadow puppetry can be traced to the Chaochow school of shadow puppet theatre. Commonly known as leather monkey shows or leather shows, the shadow plays were popular in Tainan, Kaohsiung, and Pingtung as early as the Qing dynasty (1644–1911 A.D.). Older puppeteers estimate that there were at least seventy shadow puppet troupes in the Kaohsiung area alone in the closing years of the Qing. Traditionally, the eight to twelve-inch puppet figures, and the stage scenery and props such as furniture, natural scenery, pagodas, halls, and plants, are all cut from leather. As shadow puppetry is based on light penetrating through a translucent sheet of cloth, the "shadows" are actually silhouettes seen by the audience in profile or face on. Taiwan's shadow plays are accompanied by Chaochow melodies which are often called "priest's melodies" owing to their similarity with the music used by Taoist priests at funerals. A large repertoire of some 300 scripts of the southern school of drama used in shadow puppetry and dating back to the fourteenth and fifteenth centuries has been preserved in Taiwan and is considered to be a priceless cultural asset.

===== Terminology =====
A number of terms are used to describe the different forms.

- 皮影戏, píyĭngxì is a shadow theatre that uses leather puppets. The figures are usually moved behind a thin screen. It is not entirely a show of shadows, as the shadow is more of a silhouette. This gives the figures some color on the screen; they are not 100% black and white.
- 纸影戏, zhĭyĭngxì is paper shadow theatre.
- 中国影戏, Zhōngguó yĭngxì is Chinese shadow theatre.

=== Europe ===
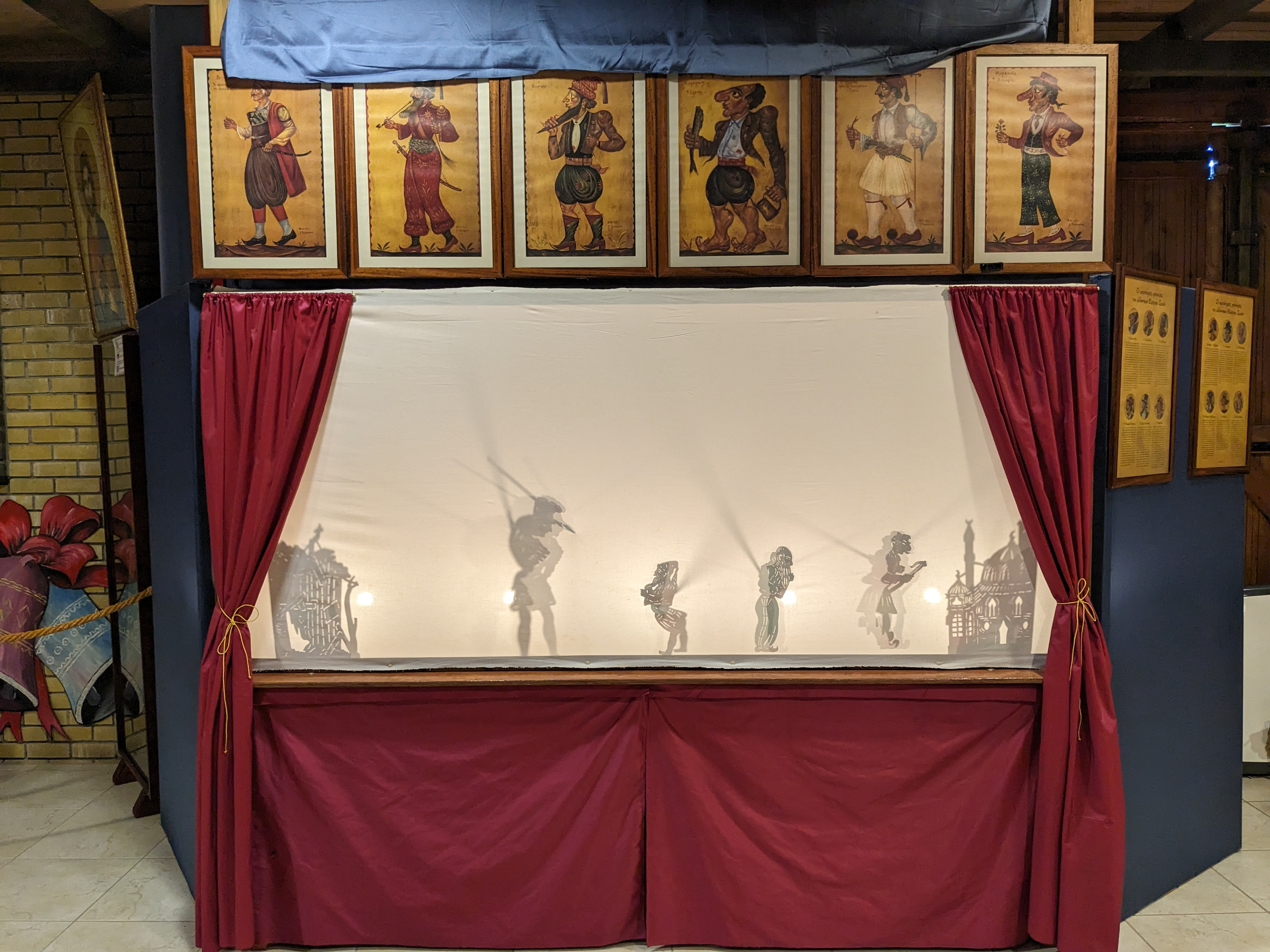
An example of shadow puppetry in Greece

In Plato's allegory of the cave (circa 380 BCE), Socrates described a kind of shadow play with figures made out of stone, wood, or other materials, presented to prisoners who in all of their life could see nothing more than the shadows on the wall in front of them. This was an imaginative illustration of ideas about the (false or limited) relations between knowledge, education, and a truthful understanding of reality. Plato compared a wall that screens off the people who carry the figures to the kind of partitions used by puppet (marionette) players to hide behind. Apparently, there was no existing form of shadow theatre known in ancient Greece that Socrates/Plato could refer to.

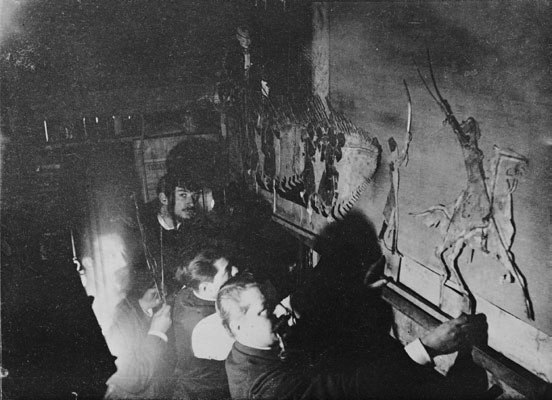
Stagehands moving zinc figures behind the screen of the Théatre d'Ombres in Le Chat Noir

Shadow plays started spreading throughout Europe at the end of the 17th century, probably via Italy. It is known that several Italian showmen performed in Germany, France and England during this period.

In 1675 German polymath and philosopher Gottfried Wilhelm Leibniz imagined a kind of world exhibition that would show all kinds of new inventions and spectacles. In a handwritten document he supposed it should include shadow theatre.

==== France ====
French missionaries brought the shadow show from China to France in 1767 and put on performances in Paris and Marseille, causing quite a stir. In time, the ombres chinoises (French for "Chinese shadows") with local modification and embellishment, became the ombres françaises and struck root in the country. The popularity of ombres chinoises reflected the chinoiserie fashion of the days.

French showman François Dominique Séraphin first presented his shadow spectacle in a hôtel particulier in Versailles in 1771. He would go on to perform at the Palace of Versailles in front of royalty. In 1784 Séraphin moved to Paris, performing his shows at his permanent theatre in the newly opened Palais-Royal from 8 September 1784. The performances would adapt to the political changes and survived the French Revolution. Séraphin developed the use of clockwork mechanisms to automate the show. His nephew took over the show after Séraphin's death in 1800 and it was continued by his heirs until the theatre closed in 1870.

In 1775, Ambrogio (also known as Ambroise and Ambrose) staged ambitious shows in Paris and London.

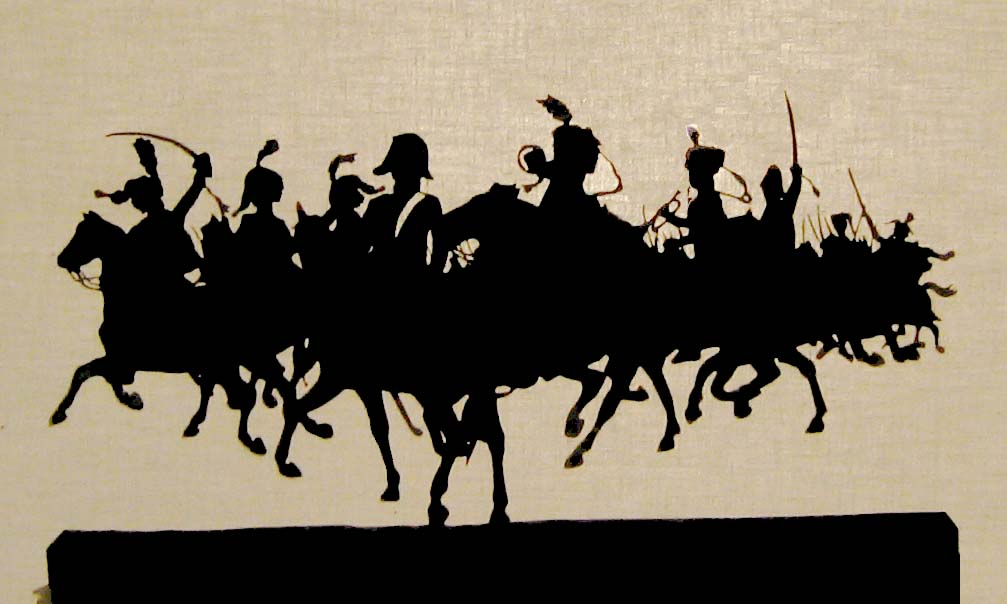
Part of the collection of the Museo del Precinema, Padua, Italy

The art was a popular entertainment in Paris during the 19th century, especially in the famous Paris nightclub district of Montmartre. The cabaret Le Chat noir ("The Black Cat") produced 45 Théatre d'ombres shows between 1885 and 1896 under the management of Rodolphe Salis. Behind a screen on the second floor of the establishment, the artist Henri Rivière worked with up to 20 assistants in a large, oxy-hydrogen back-lit performance area and used a double optical lantern to project backgrounds. Figures were originally cardboard cut-outs, but were replaced with zinc figures since 1887. Various artists took part in the creation, including Steinlen, Adolphe Willette and Albert Robida. Caran d'Ache designed circa 50 cut-outs for the very popular 1888 show L'Epopée. Musée d'Orsay has circa 40 original zinc figures in its collection. Other cabarets would produce their own versions; the ombres evolved into numerous theatrical productions and had a major influence on phantasmagoria.

In Italy, the Museum of Precinema collezione Minici Zotti in Padua houses a collection of 70 French shadow puppets, similar to those used in the cabaret Le Chat Noir, together with an original theatre and painted backdrops, as well as two magic lanterns for projecting scenes. So far, the shadow plays identified are La Marche a l'étoile (introduced by Henri Rivière), Le Sphinx (introduced by Amédée Vignola), L'Âge d'or and Le Carneval de Venise. The shadow puppets were presumably created for a tour in France or abroad at the end of the 19th century.

Nowadays, several theatre companies in France are developing the practice of shadow puppets: Le Théâtre des Ombres, Le Théâtre du Petit Miroir, Le Théâtre Les Chaises, and La Loupiote.

=== Indosphere ===
==== India ====
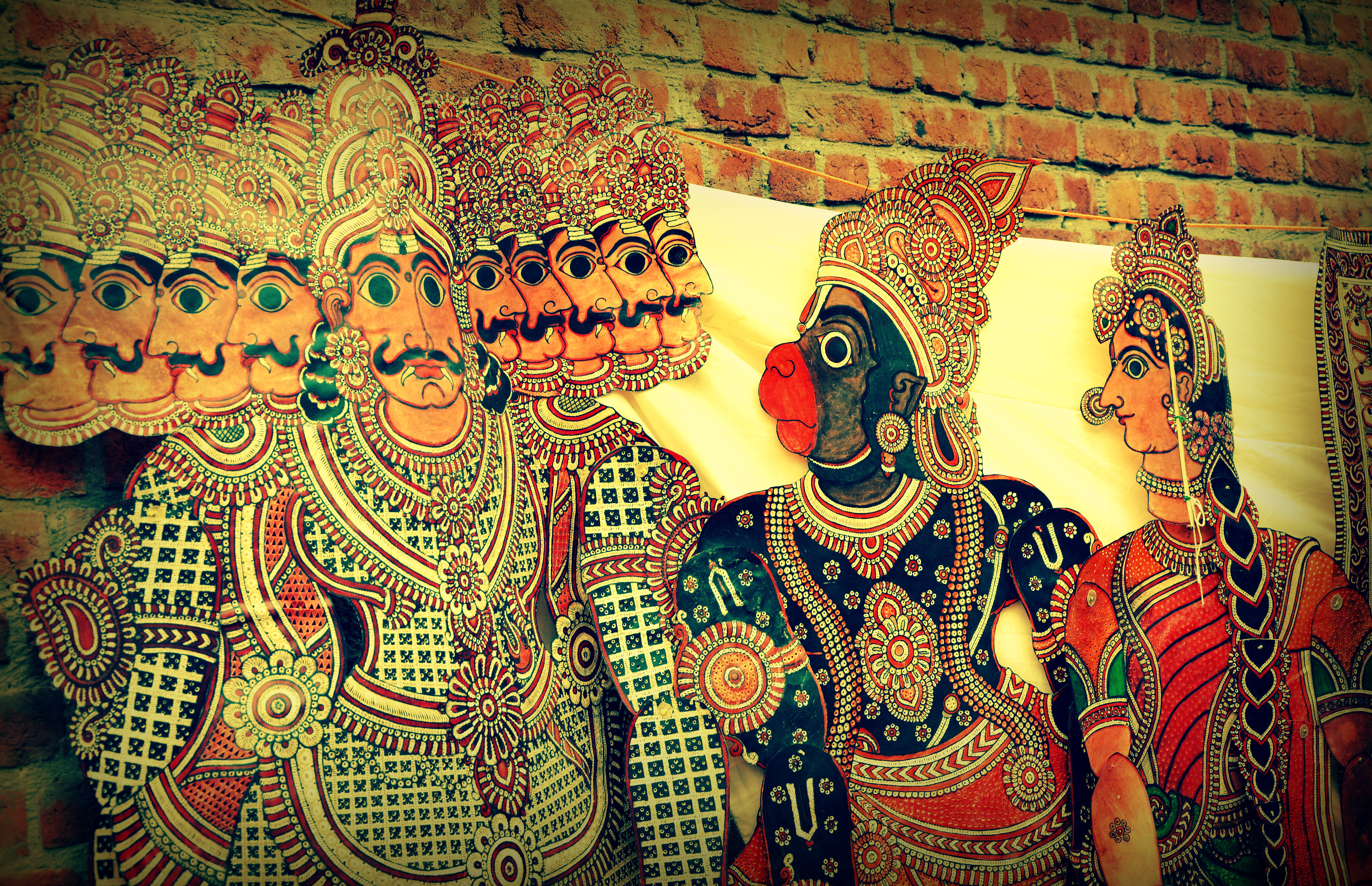
Hanuman and Ravana in tholu bommalata, the shadow puppet tradition of Andhra Pradesh, India

Shadow puppets are an ancient part of India's culture, particularly regionally as the keelu bomme and Tholu bommalata of Andhra Pradesh, the Togalu gombeyaata in Karnataka, the charma bahuli natya in Maharashtra, the Ravana chhaya in Odisha, the Tholpavakoothu in Kerala and Tamil Nadu. Shadow puppet play is also found in pictorial traditions in India, such as temple mural painting, loose-leaf folio paintings, and the narrative paintings. Dance forms such as the Chhau of Odisha literally mean "shadow". The shadow theatre dance drama theatre are usually performed on platform stages attached to Hindu temples, and in some regions these are called Koothu Madams or Koothambalams. In many regions, the puppet drama play is performed by itinerant artist families on temporary stages during major temple festivals. Legends from the Hindu epics Ramayana and the Mahabharata dominate their repertoire. However, the details and the stories vary regionally.

During the 19th century and early parts of the 20th century of the colonial era, Indologists believed that shadow puppet plays had become extinct in India, though mentioned in its ancient Sanskrit texts. In the 1930s and thereafter, states Stuart Blackburn, these fears of its extinction were found to be false as evidence emerged that shadow puppetry had remained a vigorous rural tradition in central Kerala mountains, most of Karnataka, northern Andhra Pradesh, parts of Tamil Nadu, Odisha and southern Maharashtra. The Marathi people, particularly of low caste, had preserved and vigorously performed the legends of Hindu epics as a folk tradition. The importance of Marathi artists is evidenced, states Blackburn, from the puppeteers speaking Marathi as their mother tongue in many non-Marathi speaking states of India.

A shadow play in Kerala
Ramayana legend, with audience response (45 seconds)

According to Beth Osnes, the tholu bommalata shadow puppet theatre dates back to the 3rd century BCE, and has attracted patronage ever since. The puppets used in a tholu bommalata performance, states Phyllis Dircks, are "translucent, lusciously multicolored leather figures four to five feet tall, and feature one or two articulated arms". The process of making the puppets is an elaborate ritual, where the artist families in India pray, go into seclusion, produce the required art work, then celebrate the "metaphorical birth of a puppet" with flowers and incense.

The tholu pava koothu of Kerala uses leather puppets whose images are projected on a backlit screen. The shadows are used to creatively express characters and stories in the Ramayana. A complete performance of the epic can take forty-one nights, while an abridged performance lasts as few as seven days. One feature of the tholu pava koothu show is that it is a team performance of puppeteers, while other shadow plays such as the wayang of Indonesia are performed by a single puppeteer for the same Ramayana story. There are regional differences within India in the puppet arts. For example, women play a major role in shadow play theatre in most parts of India, except in Kerala and Maharashtra. Almost everywhere, except Odisha, the puppets are made from tanned deer skin, painted and articulated. Translucent leather puppets are typical in Andhra Pradesh and Tamil Nadu, while opaque puppets are typical in Kerala and Odisha. The artist troupes typically carry over a hundred puppets for their performance in rural India.

==== Indonesia ====
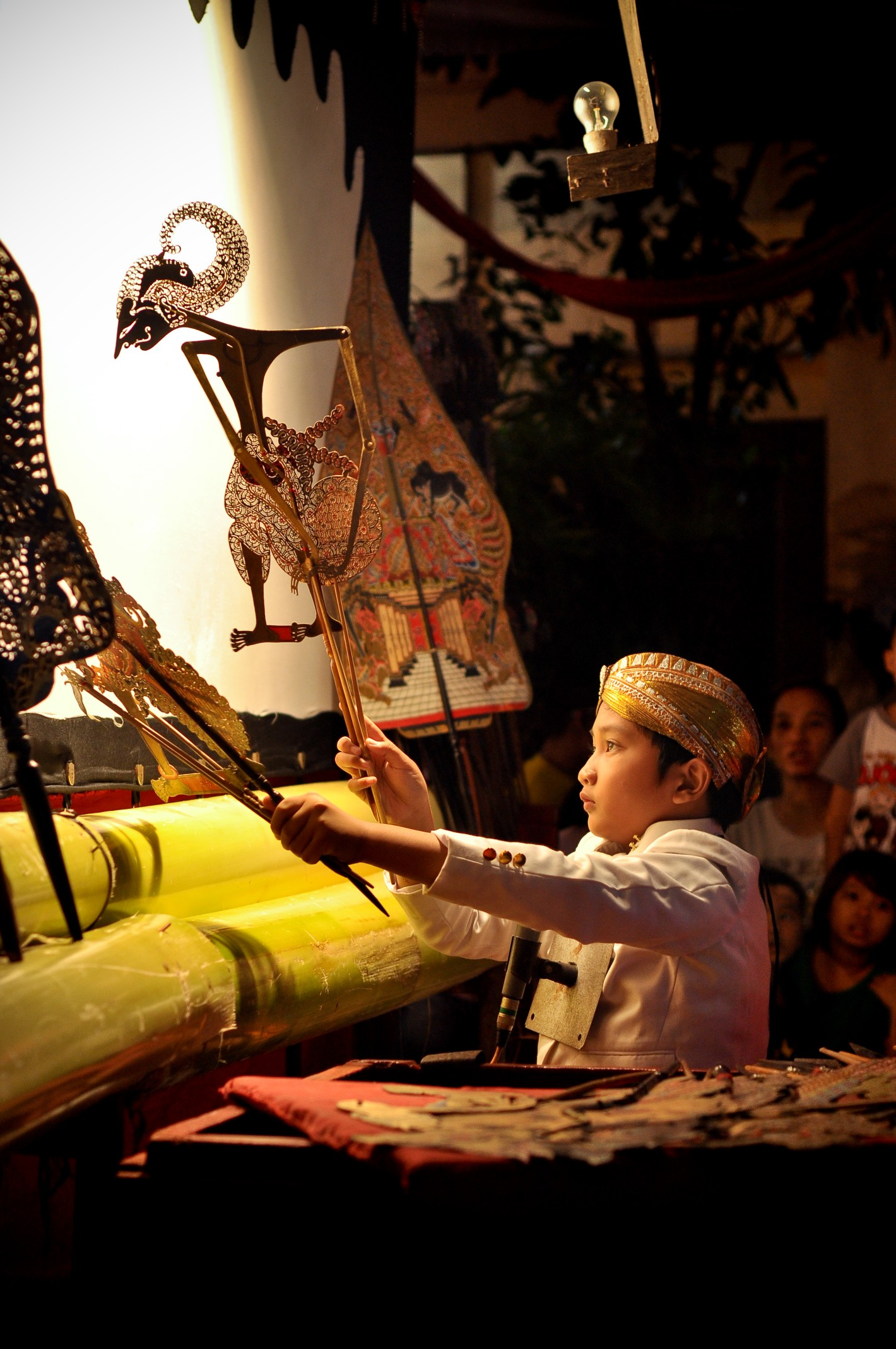
Wayang kulit shadowplay performance in Semarang, Central Java

Shadow puppet theatre is called wayang in Indonesia, wherein a dramatic story is told through shadows thrown by puppets and sometimes combined with human characters. Wayang is an ancient form of storytelling that renowned for its elaborate puppets and complex musical styles. The earliest evidence is from the late 1st millennium CE, in medieval-era texts and archeological sites. Around 860 CE an Old Javanese charter issued by Maharaja Sri Lokapala mentions three sorts of performers: atapukan, aringgit, and abanol. Ringgit is described in an 11th-century Javanese poem as a leather shadow figure. Unlike India's shadow plays that incorporated little to no musical performance, Indonesia wayang includes music played by a gamelan ensemble.

Wayang kulit, a style of wayang shadow play, is particularly popular in Java and Bali. The term derived from the word wayang literally means "shadow" or "imagination" in Javanese; it also connotes "spirit". The word kulit means "skin", as the material from which the puppet is made is thin perforated leather sheets made from buffalo skin.

Performances of shadow puppet theater in Bali are typically at night, lasting until dawn. The complete wayang kulit troupes include dalang (puppet master), nayaga (gamelan players), and sinden (female choral singer). Some of the nayaga also perform as male choral singers. The dalang (puppet master) performs the wayang behind the cotton screen illuminated by oil lamp or modern halogen lamp, creating visual effects similar to animation. The flat puppet has moveable joints that are animated by hand, using rods connected to the puppet. The handle of the rod is made of carved buffalo horn. On November 7, 2003, UNESCO designated wayang kulit from Indonesia as one of the Masterpieces of the Oral and Intangible Heritage of Humanity.

==== Malaysia ====
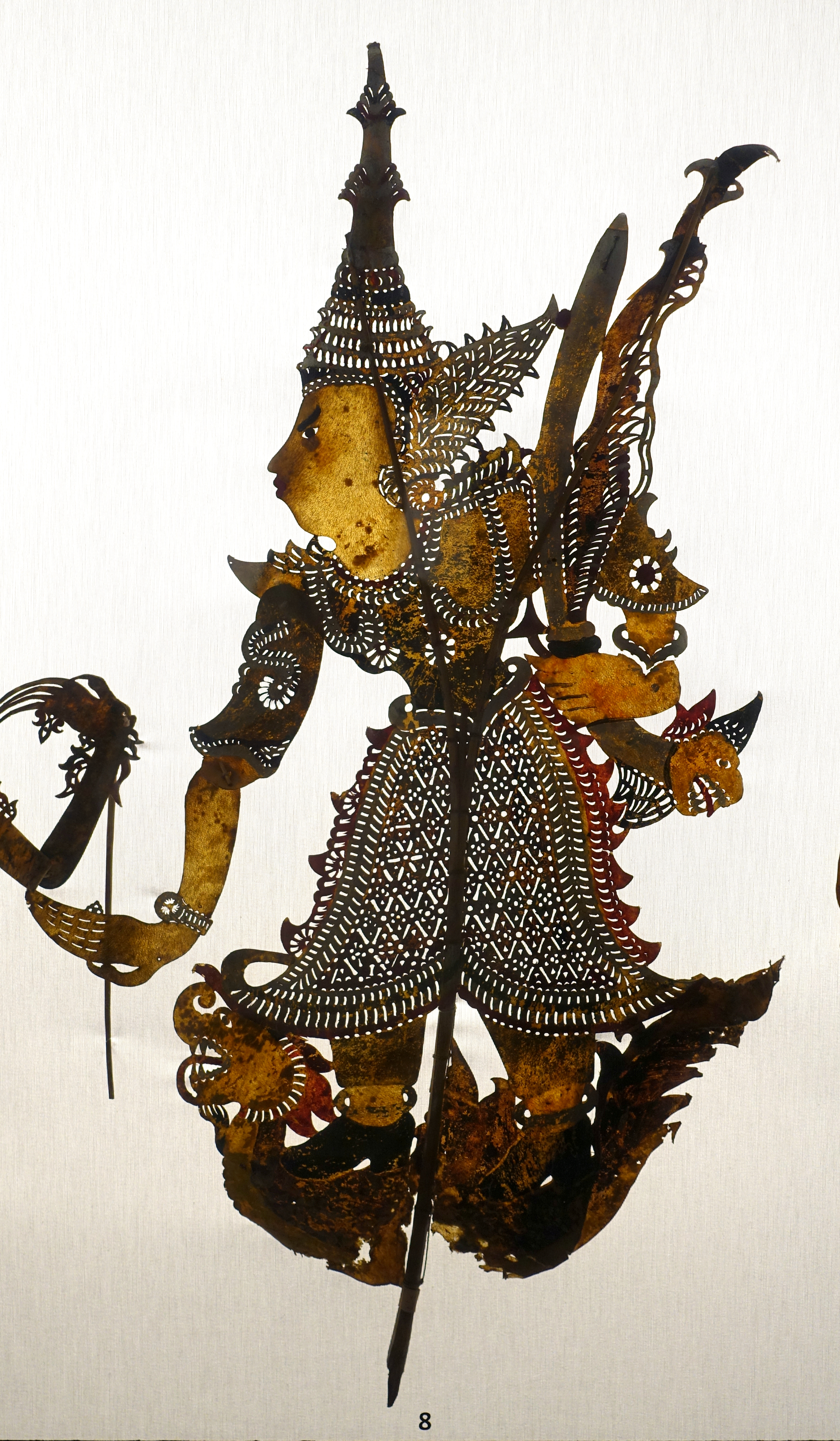
Rama in Malaysian shadow play

In Malaysia, shadow puppet plays are also known as wayang kulit. In Malay, wayang means "theater", while kulit means "skin/leather" and refers to the puppets that are made out of leather. There are four types of shadow theaters in Malaysia: wayang kulit Jawa, wayang kulit Gedek, wayang kulit Melayu, and wayang kulit Siam. Wayang kulit Jawa and wayang kulit Melayu can be traced back to Javanese Shadows while wayang kulit Gedek and wayang kulit Siam are traced back to Southern Thailand's shadow theaters. Stories presented are usually mythical and morality tales. There is an educational moral to the plays, which usually portray a battle. Malay shadow plays are sometimes considered one of the earliest examples of animation. The wayang kulit in the northern states of Malaysia such as Kelantan is influenced by and similar to Thai shadow puppets, while the wayang kulit in the southern Malay peninsula, especially in Johor, is borrowed from Javanese Indonesian wayang kulit with slight differences in the story and performance.

The puppets are made primarily of leather and manipulated with sticks or buffalo horn handles. Shadows are cast using an oil lamp or, in modern times, a halogen light, onto a cotton cloth background. They are often associated with gamelan music.

==== Cambodia ====
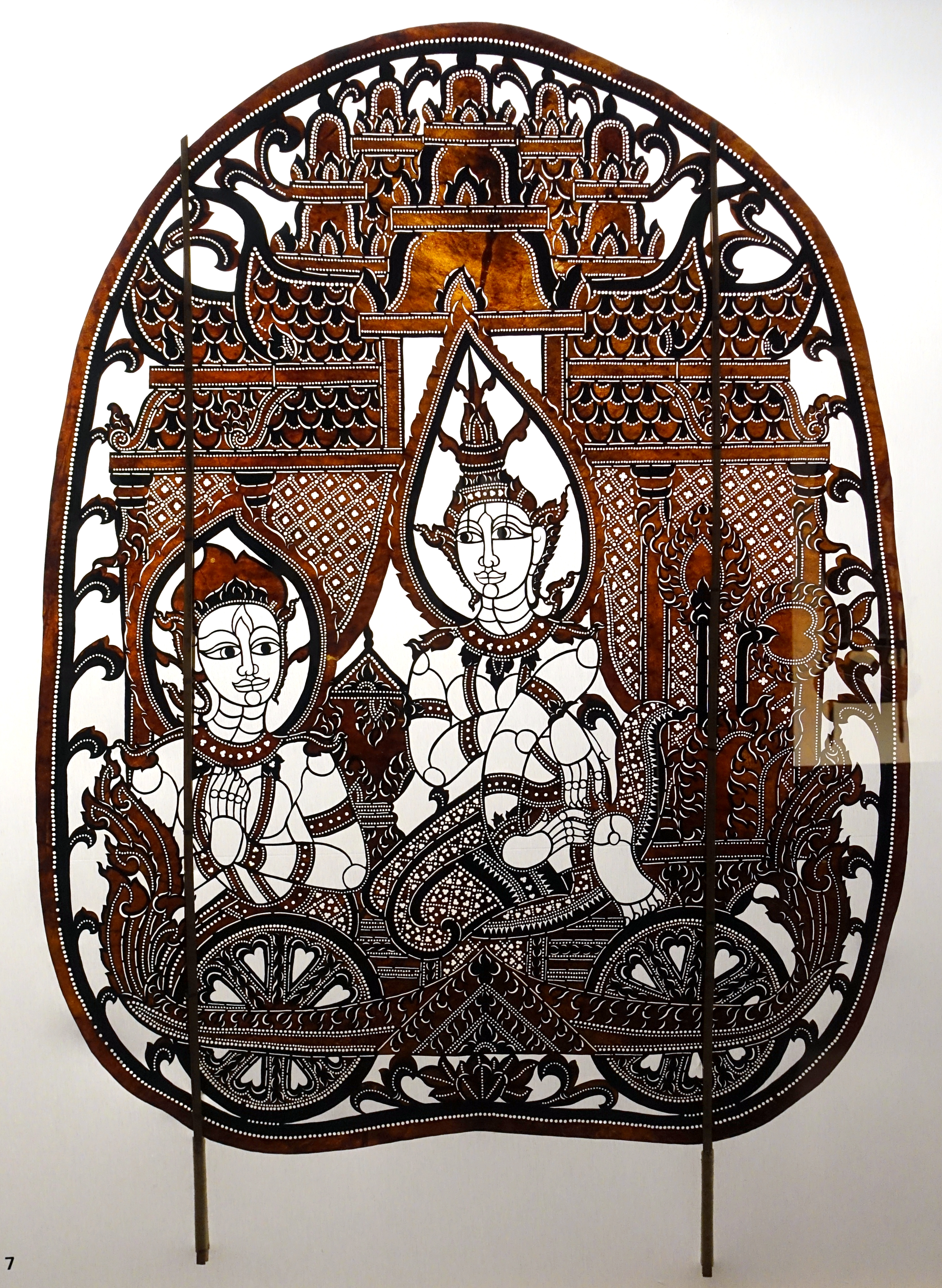
Cambodian shadow puppet depicting Sita

In Cambodia, the shadow play is called Nang Sbek Thom, or simply as Sbek Thom (literally "large leather hide"), Sbek Touch ("small leather hide") and Sbek Por ("colored leather hide").

It is performed during sacred temple ceremonies, at private functions, and for the public in Cambodia's villages. The popular plays include the Ramayana and Mahabharata epics, as well as other Hindu myth and legends. The performance is accompanied by a pinpeat orchestra.

The Sbek Thom is based on the Cambodian version of the Indian epic Ramayana, an epic story about good and evil involving Rama, Sita, Lakshmana, Hanuman and Ravana. It is a sacred performance, embodying Khmer beliefs built on the foundations and mythologies of Brahmanism and Buddhism.

Cambodian shadow puppets are made of cowhide, and their size are usually quite large, depicting a whole scene, including its background. Unlike their Javanese counterparts, Cambodian shadow puppets are usually not articulated, rendering the figure's hands unmovable, and are left uncolored, retaining the original color of the leather. The main shadow puppet production center is Roluos near Siem Reap. Cambodian shadow puppetry is one of the cultural performances staged for tourists alongside Cambodian traditional dances.

The Sbek Thom figures are unlike puppets because they are large and heavy, with no moveable parts. The Sbek Touch, in contrast, are much smaller puppets with movable parts; their shows have been more popular. The Sbek Thom shadow play involves many puppeteers dancing on the screen, each puppeteer playing one character of the Ramayana, while separate narrators recite the story accompanied by an orchestra.

==== Thailand ====
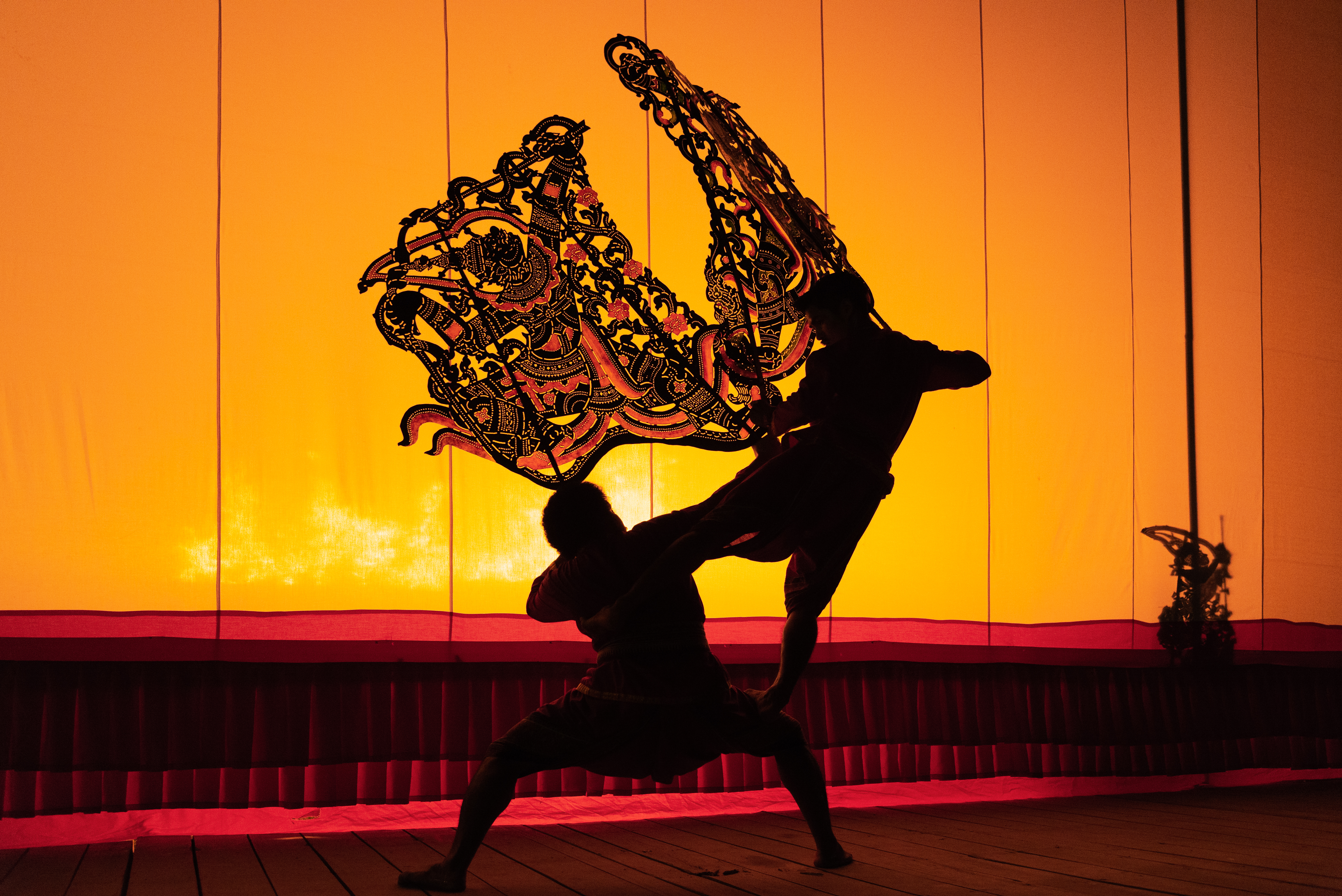
Nang yai

Shadow theatre in Thailand is called nang yai (which uses large and steady figures); in the south there is a tradition called nang talung (which uses small, movable figures). Nang yai puppets are normally made of cowhide and rattan and are carried by people in front of the screen compared to behind it. Nang talung shadow play usually occur at domestic rituals and ceremonies or at commercial and temple fairs but they are starting to occur on Thai television.

There are different kind of performers in Thailand's shadow play. Nang samai performers are more modern in terms of music and dialogue while Nang booraan performers are more traditional. Performances are normally accompanied by a combination of songs and chants. Moreover, there are specific types of performances in Thailand that are political than theatrical like which are called nang kaanmuang.

Performances in Thailand were temporarily suspended in 1960 due to a fire at the national theatre. Nang drama has influenced modern Thai cinema, including filmmakers like Cherd Songsri and Payut Ngaokrachang.

=== Turkey ===
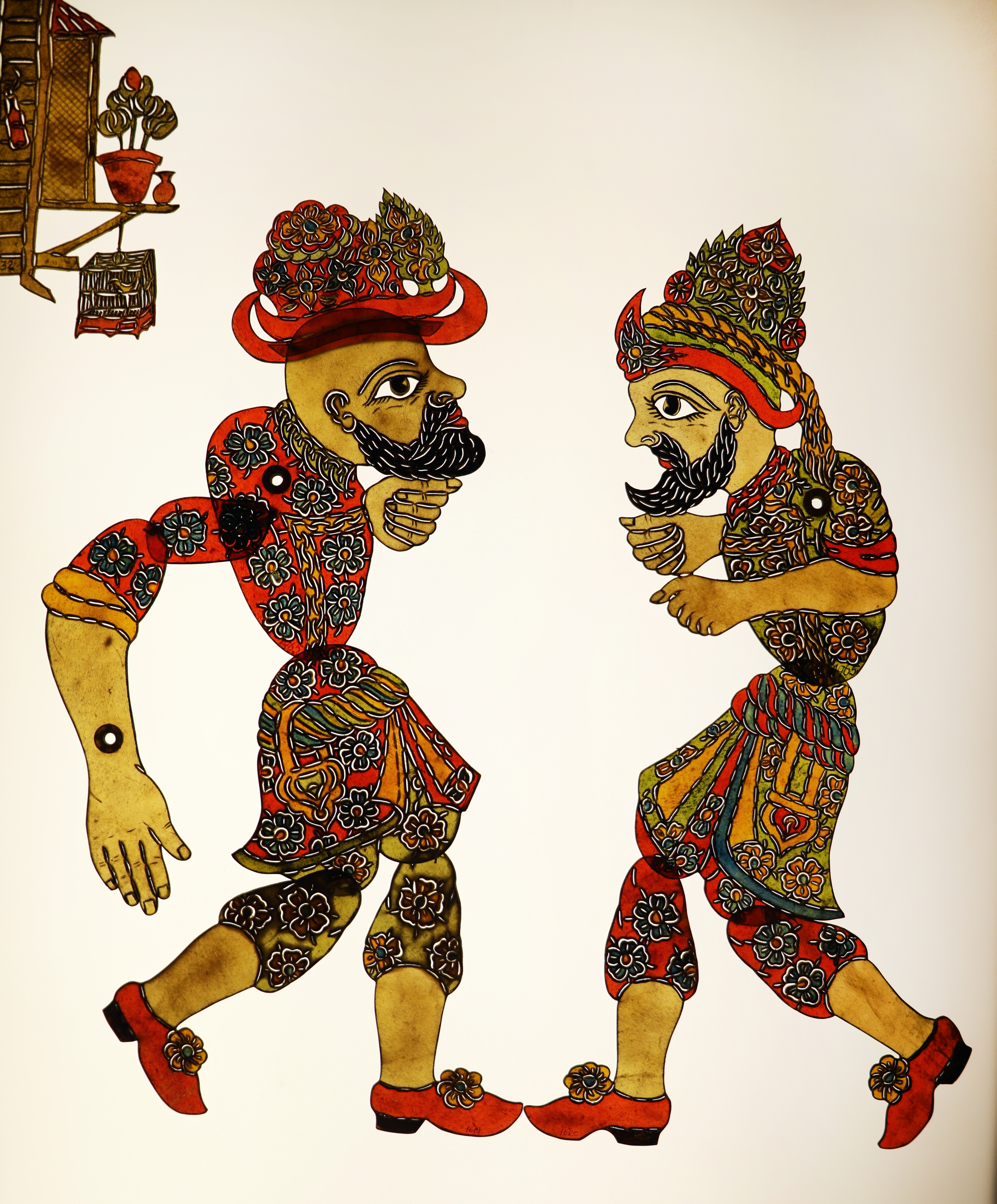
Shadow play Karagöz puppets from Turkey

A more bawdy comedy tradition of shadow play was widespread throughout the Ottoman Empire, possibly since the late 14th century. It was centered around the contrasting interaction between the figures Karagöz and Hacivat: an unprincipled peasant and his fussy, educated companion. Together with other characters they represented all the major social groups in Ottoman culture. The theatres had an enormous following and would take place in coffee houses and in rich private houses and even performed before the sultan. Every quarter of the city had its own Karagöz.

The Karagöz theatre consisted of a three sided booth covered with a curtain printed with branches and roses and a white cotton screen by about three feet by four which was inserted in the front. The performance had a three man orchestra who sat at the foot of a small raised stage where they would play for the audience. The show would start when the puppet master lit the oil lamp. The show could be introduced by a singer, accompanied by a tambourine player. The background and scenery would sometimes include moving ships, riders moving on horseback, swaying palm trees and even dragons. The sound effects included songs and various voices.

Puppets were made to be about 15 inches or 35–40 centimeters high and oiled to make them look translucent. The puppets were made of either horse, water buffalo or calf skin. They had movable limbs and were jointed with waxed thread at the neck, arms, waist and knees and manipulated from rods in their back and held by the finger of the puppet master. The hide is worked until it is semi-transparent; then it is colored, resulting in colorful projections. Karagöz theatre was also adapted in Egypt and North Africa.

== Shadow puppetry today ==
The Adventures of Prince Achmed (1926), an animated film directed by Lotte Reiniger

In the 1910s, the German animator Lotte Reiniger pioneered silhouette animation as a format, whereby shadow-play-like puppets are filmed frame-by-frame. This technique has been kept alive by subsequent animators and is still practised today, though cel animation and computer animation has also been used to imitate the look of shadow play and silhouette animation. By the 1920s, shadow puppetry had breached the world of German Expressionism, through the silent film Warning Shadows.

Traditional Chinese shadow puppetry was brought to audiences in the United States in the 1920s and 1930s through the efforts of Pauline Benton. Contemporary artists such as Annie Katsura Rollins have perpetuated the medium, sometimes combining the form with Western theatre.

Shadow theatre is still popular in many parts of Asia. Prahlad Acharya is one famous Indian magician who incorporates it into his performances.

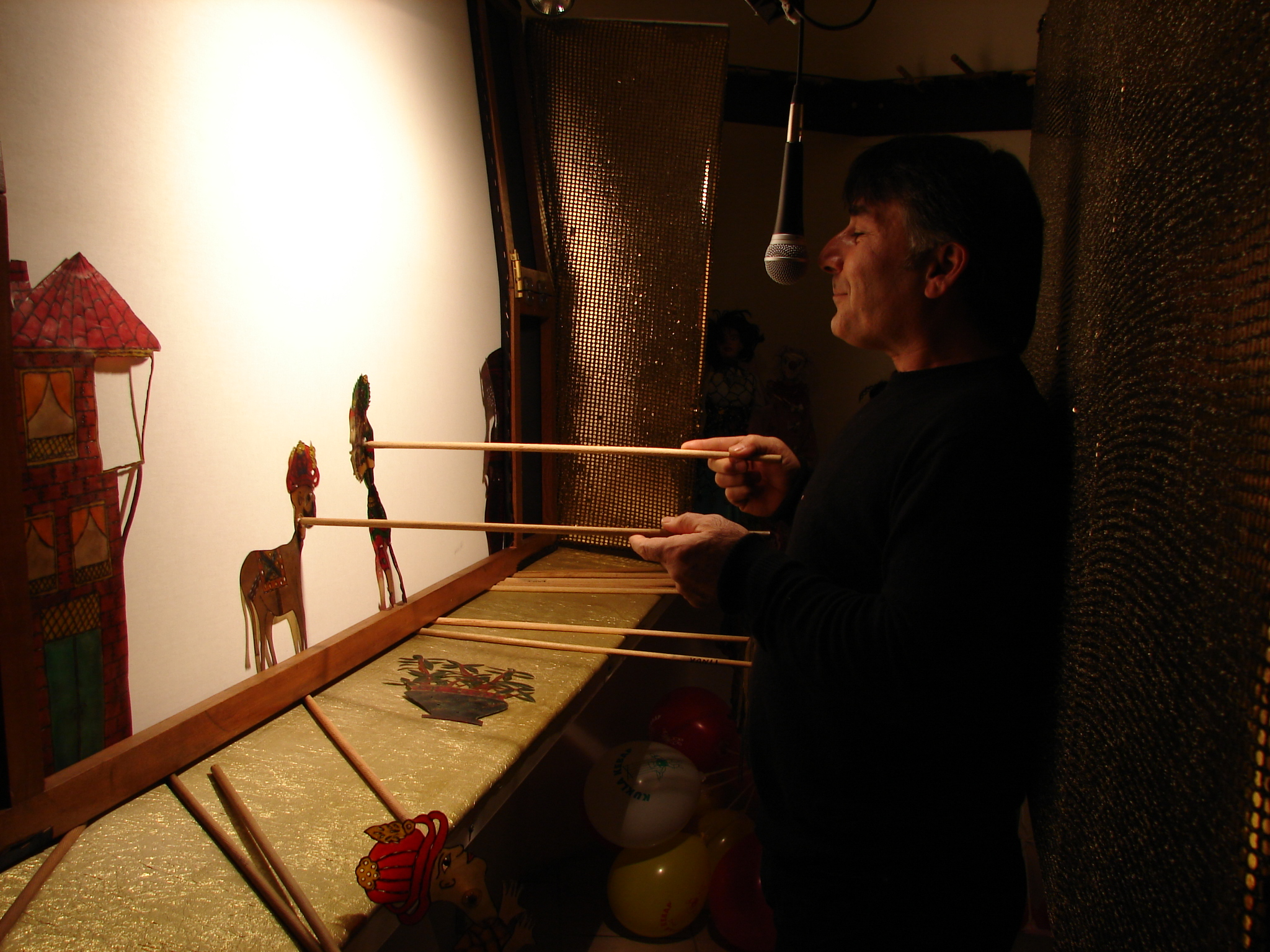
Shadow puppeteer, 2006

In the 2010s, performer Tom McDonagh introduced 3-D shadow puppets and the use of laser-cut objects.

It also appears occasionally in Western popular culture; for example:

- The Broadway musical The Lion King
- The children's television show Bear in the Big Blue House
- The 1983 film The Year of Living Dangerously opens with a scene from an Indonesian wayang shadow play
- The 2004 video game Sudeki opens with a shadow puppet play setting the stage for the game
- The Center for Puppetry Arts in Atlanta, Georgia, has an extensive variety of Chinese shadow puppets in their Asian collection.
- The 2010 film The Karate Kid
- The Disney Channel show What a Life features shadow puppetry from Sunny Seki.
- Music videos, notably "The Free Design" by Stereolab and "Twice" by Little Dragon
- The 2021 film Candyman uses shadow puppetry to portray several African-American victims of racial violence throughout history, including Sherman Fields (who appears at the beginning of the film), Anthony Crawford, George Stinney, and James Byrd Jr.
- In 2023, the performer known as Shadow Ace performed on season 18 of America's Got Talent to a standing ovation.

== Gallery ==
Galleries

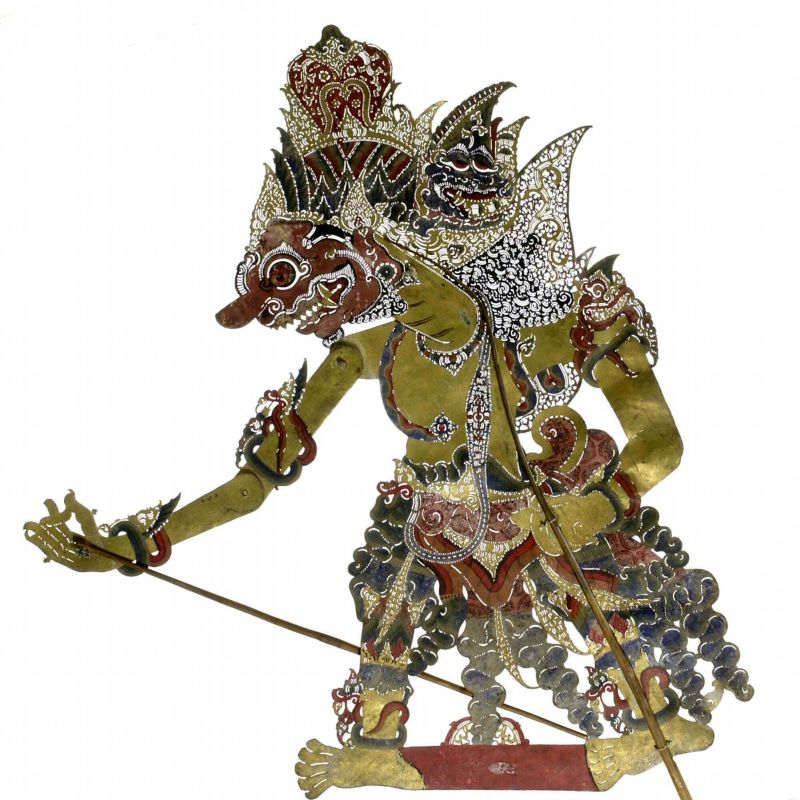
Wayang Kulit (Shadow Puppet) Kumbakarna, Tropenmuseum Collections, Indonesia, before 1914

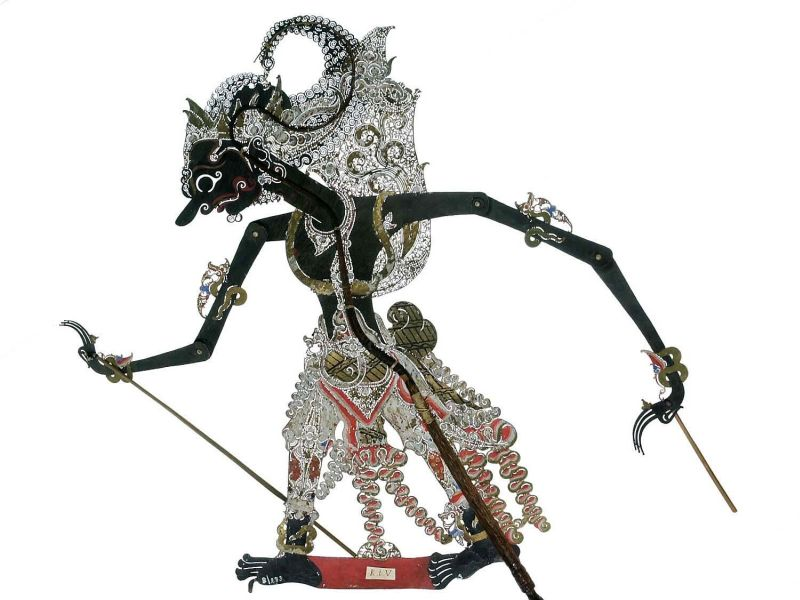
Wayang Kulit (Shadow Puppet) Gatot Kaca, Tropenmuseum Collections, Indonesia, before 1914

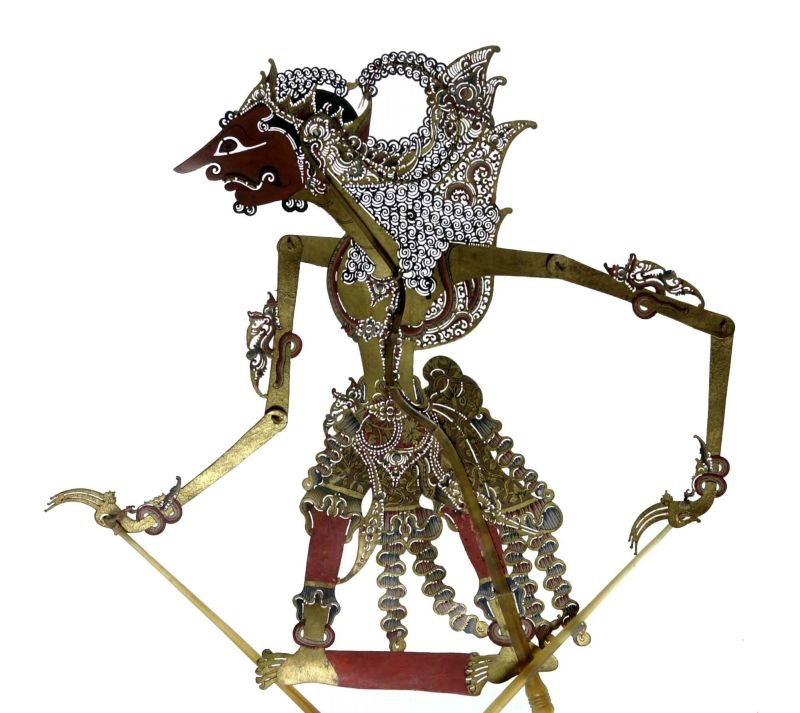
Wayang Kulit (Shadow Puppet) Wibisana, Tropenmuseum Collections, Indonesia before 1933

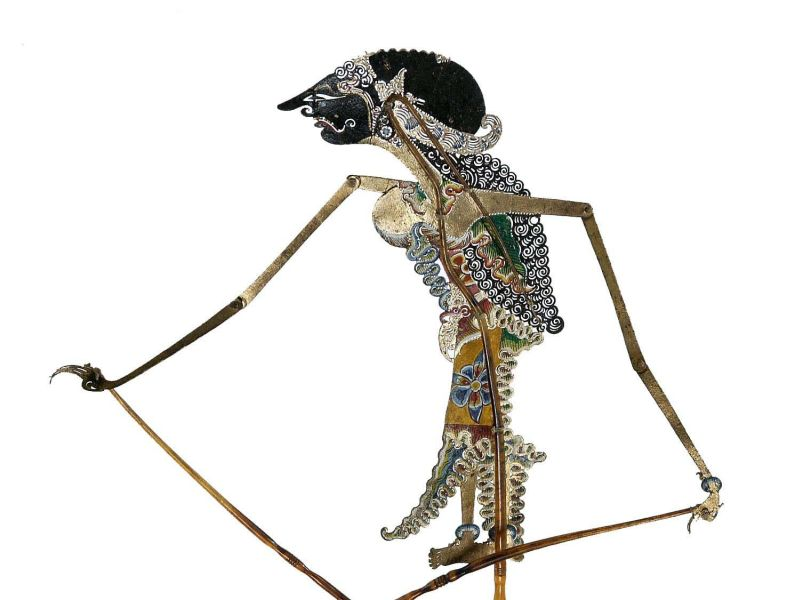
Wayang Kulit (Shadow Puppet) Princess Shinta, Tropenmuseum Collections, Indonesia before 1983

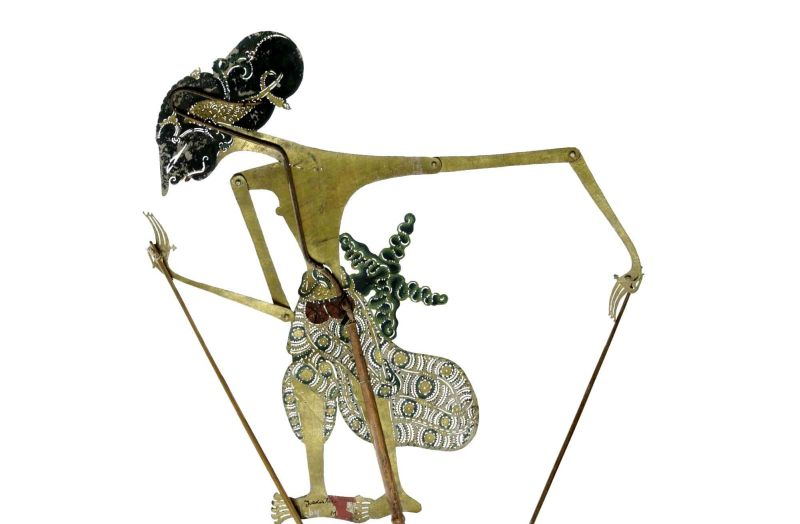
Wayang Kulit (Shadow Puppet) Yudhishthira, Tropenmuseum Collections, Indonesia before 1914

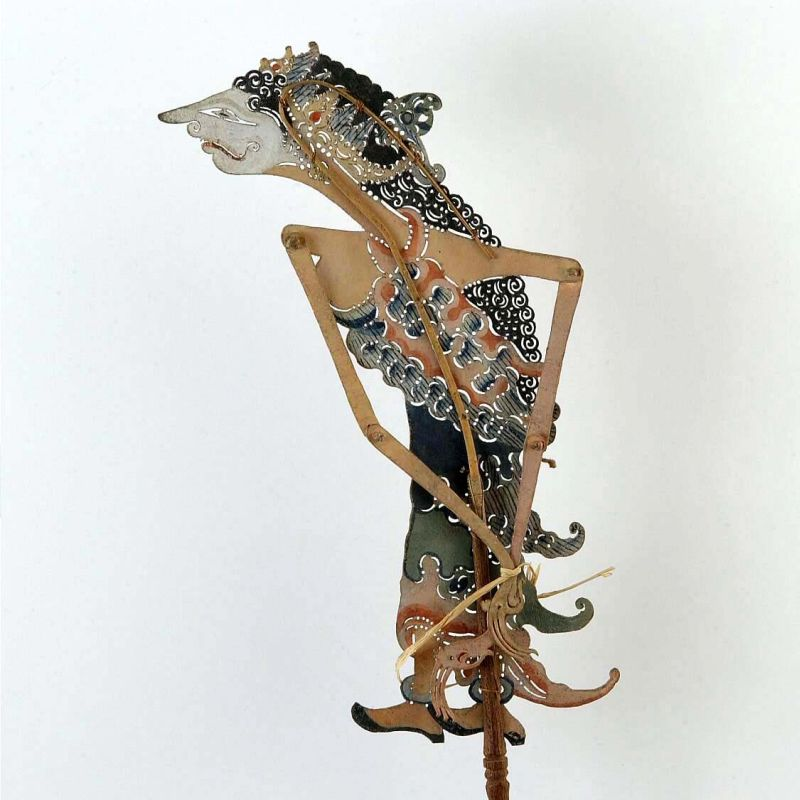
Wayang Kulit (Shadow Puppet) Princess Tari, Tropenmuseum Collections, Indonesia before 1934

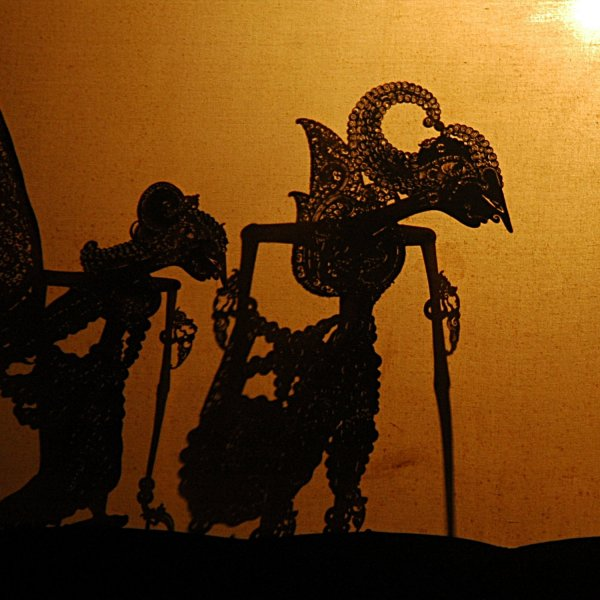
Indonesian Wayang kulit as seen by the audience

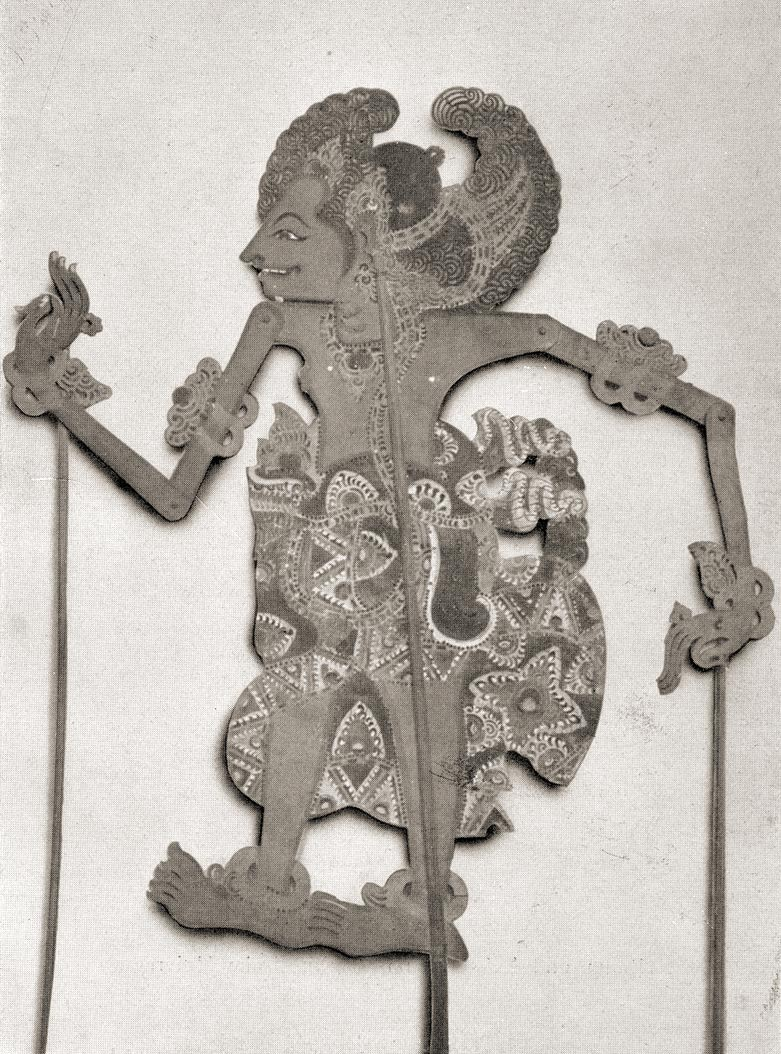
Wayang kulit puppet in Bali, Indonesia

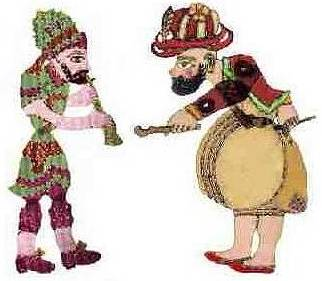
Karagöz and Hacivat

Short video showing shadow play in Kota Bahru, Malaysia, including behind the scenes

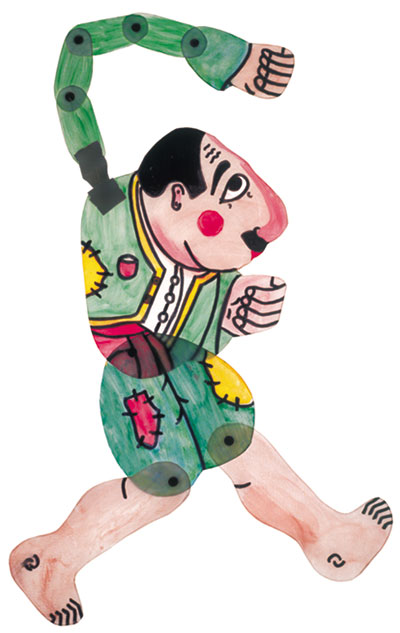
Karagiozis shadow puppet
