= Kathputli (puppetry) =

Puppet theatre from Rajasthan, India

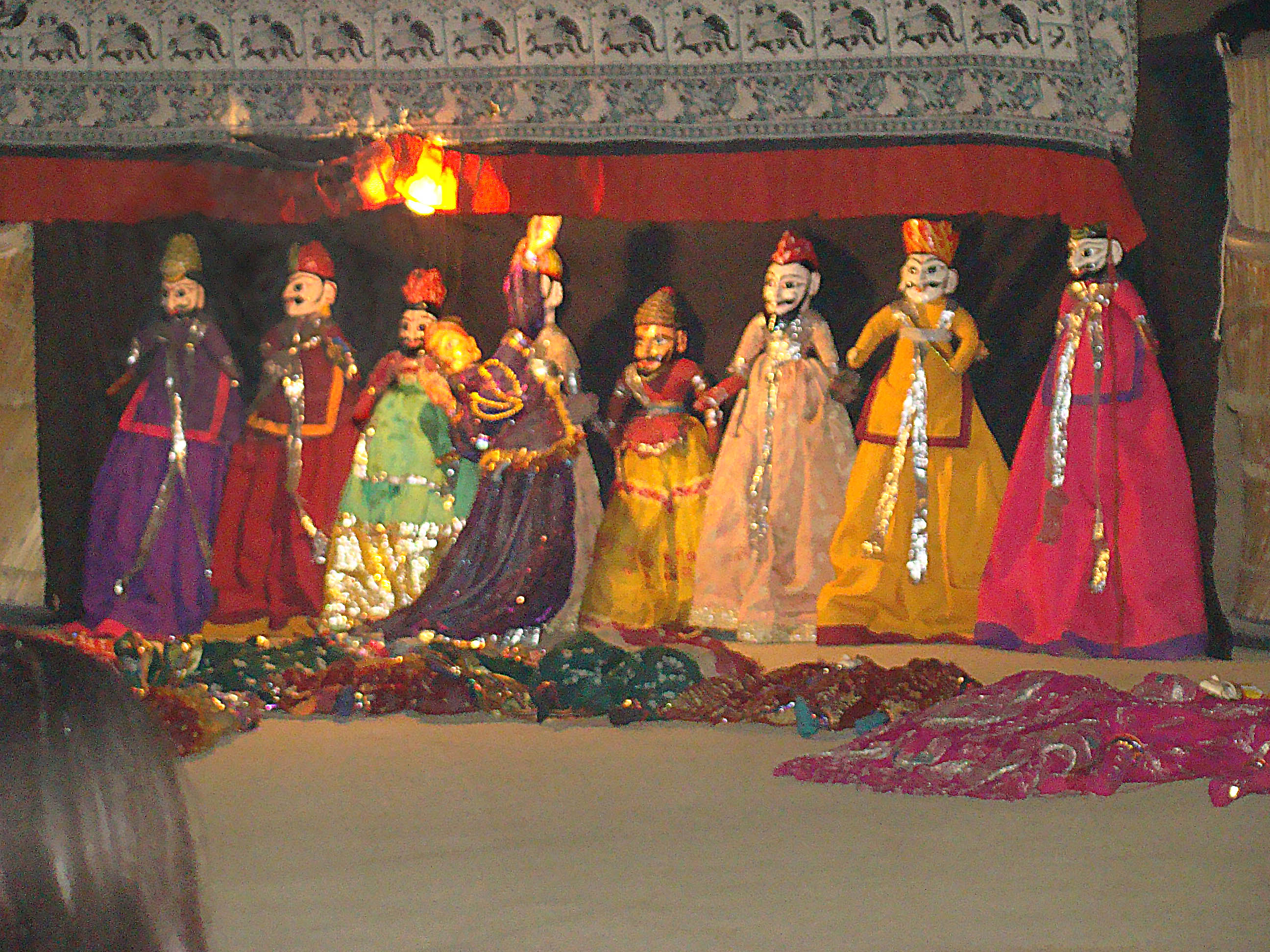
A Kathputli show in Mandawa, Rajasthan, India

Kathputli is a string puppet theatre native to Rajasthan, India, and is the most popular form of Indian puppetry. Being a string marionette, it is controlled by a single string that passes it from the top of the puppet over the puppeteers.

Putli meaning a doll. Kathputli means a puppet which is made entirely from wood. However it is made out of wood, cotton cloth and metal wire.

== History ==
Some scholars believe Kathputli art tradition is more than thousands of years old. One finds its reference in Rajasthani folk tales, ballads, and sometimes even in folk songs. Similar puppets, which are rod-puppets, are also found in west Bengal. But it is Rajasthan's Kathputli which made India one of the first countries to invent its traditional puppetry. Tribes of Rajasthan have been performing this art from the ancient times and it has become an eternal part of Rajasthani culture diversity and tradition. No village fair, no religious festival, and no social gathering in Rajasthan can be complete without the Kathputlis. It is believed that somewhere 1,500 years ago, tribal Rajasthan Bhat community started the use of Kathputli as string marionette art and it is in their love for tradition that art of Kathputli survived the test of time. Tradition of Kathputli is based on folk tales and stories. Scholars believe that folk tales convey the lifestyle of ancient Rajasthani tribal people and Kathputli art might have originated from present day Nagaur and surrounding areas. Rajasthani kings and nobles were patrons of art and craft and they encouraged the craftsmen in activities ranging from wood and marble carving to weaving, pottery, painting and jewellery. Over the last 500 years, Kathputli was a system of patronage supported by kings and well-off families. The patrons would look after the artists in return for the artists singing praises of the patrons’ ancestors. Bhat community claim that their ancestors had performed for royal families, and received great honour and prestige from the rulers of Rajasthan.

Today Kathputli art is one of the most popular performing arts of Rajasthan state of India after Ghoomar. Organisations like Rupayan Sansthan in Jodhpur founded by Vijaydan Detha and Komal Kothari in 1960 and Bharatiya Lok Kala Mandal, Udaipur, founded by Devilal Samar in 1952, are working in the field preserving and promoting the art of Kathputli. The latter even has a puppet theater as well as puppet museum. Capital New Delhi also has an area known as 'Kathputli Colony', in Shadipur Depot, where puppeteers, magicians, acrobats, dancers and musicians and other itinerant performance groups have settled for half a century.

== Overview ==
Characteristic to this form are the shrill voices produced by the lead puppeteer which are spoken through a bamboo reed. The art of Rajasthani puppetry (also called Kathputli) originated a thousand years ago when the Bhat community began to practice this art. Patronised by many ruling families in the state, it soon grew into a major art form of the region.

== See also ==
- Chadar Badar, puppet art of Santhal people of India
- Gopalila, puppet art of Odisha state of India
- Nokkuvidya pavakali, puppet art of Kerala state of India
- Rabana Chhaya, shadow puppet art of Odisha state of India
- Sakhi kandhei, string puppet art of Odisha state of India
- Shadow play, shadow puppet art which originated in first millennium BCE in India
- Tholpavakoothu, shadow puppet art of Kerala and Tami Nadu states of India
- Tholu bommalata, shadow puppet art of Andhra Pradesh state of India
- Togalu gombeyaata, shadow puppet art of Karnataka state of India
- Wayang, Indonesian and Malay equivalent
- Hun lakhon lek, Thai equivalent
- Nang yai, Thai equivalent
- Nang talung, Thai equivalent
