= Nokkuvidya pavakali =

Form of puppetry practiced in India

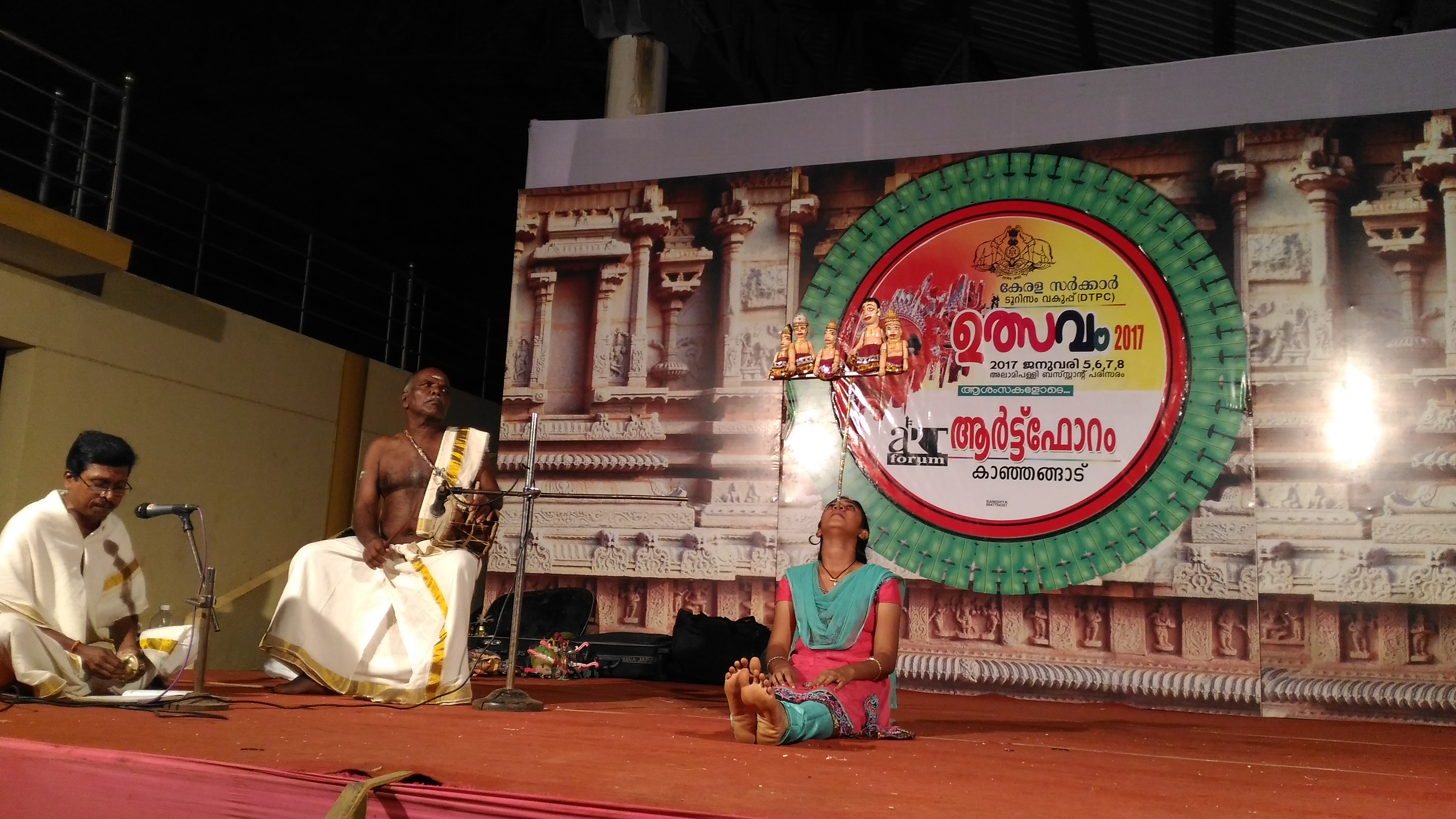
- Ranjini, granddaughter of Moozhikkal Pankajakshi performing Nokuvidyapavakali at the stage of UTSAVAM2017 at Kanhangad in Kasaragod Dt.

Nokkuvidya pavakali or simply Nokkuvidya is a type of puppetry from Kerala, India. It is a method of telling stories by moving small puppets fixed on a two foot long thin stick which is holding between the nose and the upper lip. It usually depicts stories from Ramayana and Mahabharata.

== Overview ==
Nokkuvidya pavakali is a type of puppetry practiced in Kerala, India. It is a method of telling stories by moving small puppets fixed on a thin stick which is holding between the nose and the upper lip.

Nokkuvidya is a folk art form performed by the Velapanikar community of Kerala. It was originally called Onamthullal as it was performed during the days of Onam. A Nokuvidya puppet show usually depicts the stories from Ramayana, like the battle of Rama and Ravana and Sita's return. Stories from Mahabharata are also performed.

== Myth ==
According to the myths, in the past, Shiva and Parvati disguised themselves as Kuravan and Kurathi (Velan and Velathi). At that time Lord Shiva performed an art form to please Goddess Parvati. Lord Shiva was the first to perform Nokkuvidya by making few puppets out of wood hewed from Ezhilampala tree in the forest and fixing a kamuk stick below it. It is believed that the art form was later passed on to the later generations of the Velar community.

== History ==
Nokkuvidya is an art that was encouraged by the kings of Travancore by giving them silk and bangles. This art form was very popular in South Kerala during Onam days. But this puppet show, disappeared from the performance over time. Later, Moozhikkal Pankajakshi brought this art form back to public attention. Ranjini, granddaughter of Moozhikkal Pankajakshi is also a noted performer of Nokuvidya pavakali.

== Making ==
Puppets for the Nokkuvidya are made by carving the wood of Ezhilampala (Alstonia scholaris). The two foot long stick which the puppets are fixed is made with wood of the kamuk (Areca catechu). Natural coloring substances like charcoal, leaf extracts and fruit juice are used as colours.

== Performance ==
This art form is performed sitting on a grass mat spread on the ground. The Nokkuvidya pavakali begins by lighting a Nilavilakku and praying for the blessings of Ganesha, Saraswati and Lakshmi. Then three lamps (represents three eyes of Shiva) fixed on a two-foot-long wooden stick, holding between the nose and the upper lip, is lit.

After the initial prayers the puppet show begins. The puppets fixed on a two foot long stick will then be balanced above the head, holding between the nose and the upper lip. The string connecting the puppets is moved gently with the hands to the rhythm of the song and the story.

The background instruments used are Ganchira and Kaimani.

== Works on Nokkuvidya ==
Reshmi Radhakrishnan's documentary film Nokkuvidya, The life of a lone string puppeteer, screened at the International Documentary and Short Film Festival of Kerala, is about Nokkuvidya and its performers Pankajakshi and Renjini.

== See also ==
- Chadar Badar, puppet art of Santhal people of India
- Gopalila, puppet art of Odisha state of India
- Kathputli, puppet art of Rajasthan state of India
- Rabana Chhaya, shadow puppet art of Odisha state of India
- Sakhi kandhei, string puppet art of Odisha state of India
- Shadow play, shadow puppet art which originated in first millennium BCE in India
- Tholpavakoothu, shadow puppet art of Kerala and Tamil Nadu states of India
- Tholu bommalata, shadow puppet art of Andhra Pradesh state of India
- Togalu gombeyaata, shadow puppet art of Karnataka state of India
- Wayang, Indonesian and Malay equivalent
- Hun lakhon lek, Thai equivalent
- Nang yai, Thai equivalent
- Nang talung, Thai equivalent
