= Rabana Chhaya =

Shadow puppetry from Odisha, India

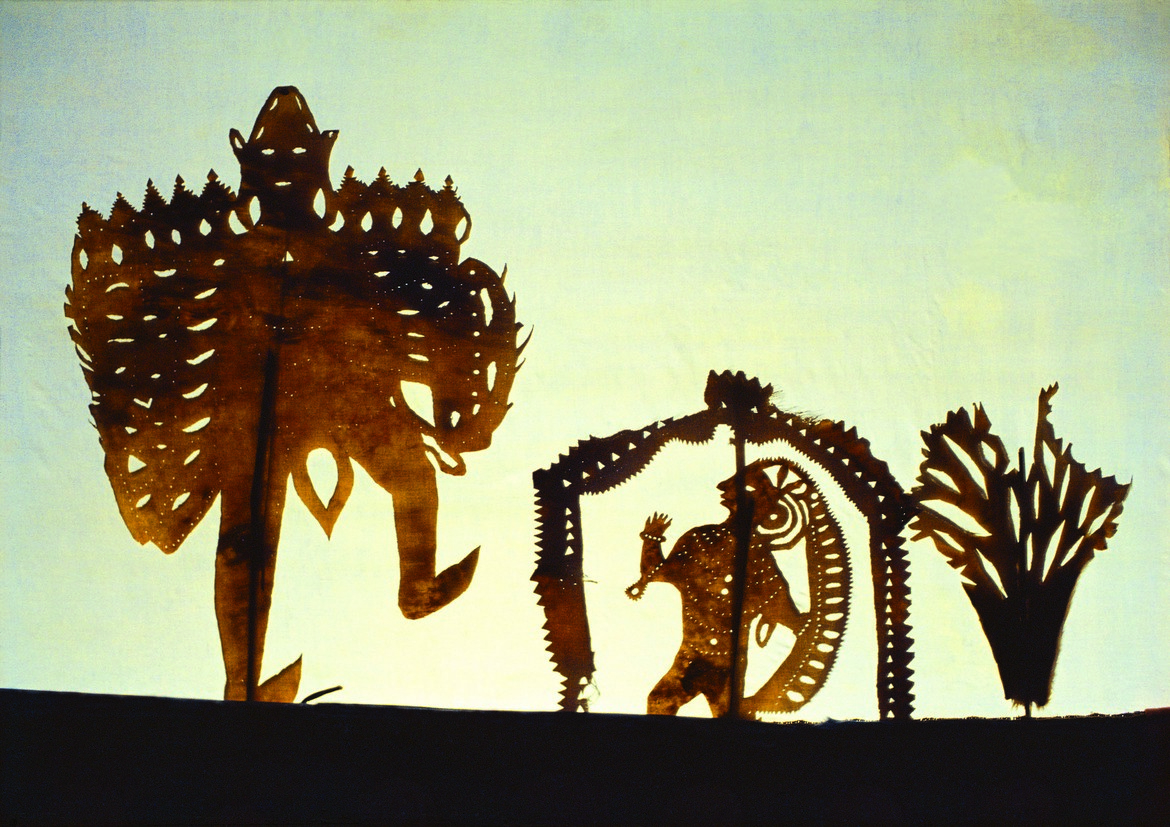
Ravana tries to kidnap Sita

Rabana Chhaya is a form of shadow puppetry from the eastern Indian state of Odisha.

== History ==
Rabana Chhaya literally means 'the shadow of Ravana' and is named after the eponymous evil king of the Hindu epic Ramayana. The lyrics for the performance are taken from the Bichitra Ramayana by the Odia poet Biswanatha Khuntia. That it has been named after the villain of the Ramayana. Alternately it has been suggested that it was not named after Rama as he is an incarnation of the god Vishnu and it would have been inauspicious to refer to him as a shadow.

== Puppets ==
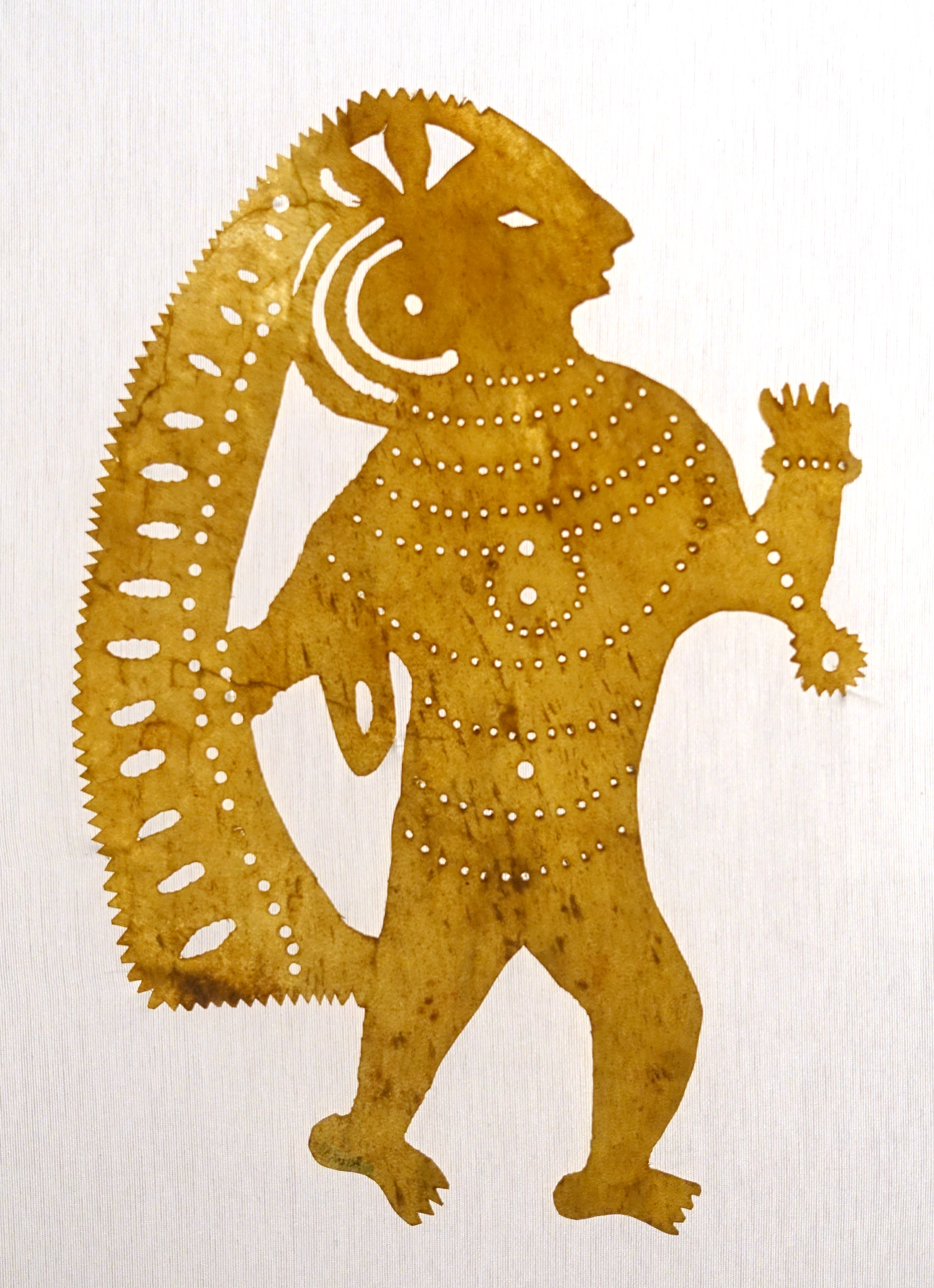
Sita, wife of Rama, Rabana Chhaya

Puppets used in Rabana Chhaya are made of deerskin, range from 6 inches to 2 feet in height and are mounted on bamboo poles. A complete performance requires as many as 700 puppets with multiple puppets being used to depict a diversity of moods for individual characters. Besides these puppets, there are others that set the background and the stock characters of the village barber and his grandson. The puppets are not coloured, have no joints and have perforations that outline their figures and costumes. The puppeteer manipulates the puppets using a split bamboo stick that runs down the middle of the puppet. The puppeteers magnify the shadows by holding the puppets away from the screen. These puppets are treated ceremonially, being blessed before they are first used and are cremated and the ashes strewn in a river when they become worn out and unusable. Another feature of the puppets is that the puppet form of Rabana is much larger than that of Rama with greater dramatic impact and casts an impressive shadow on the screen.

== Performances ==
Rabana Chhaya performances are held at night, the shadow of the puppets being projected onto a white curtain against the light of an oil lamp. The performance begins with the breaking of a coconut and with invocations to the Hindu gods Rama and Ganesha. The story of the performance is narrated in prose by a narrator, called gayak, who is accompanied by two singers. The performers traditionally belong to the Bhata community and the singing is accompanied by musical instruments including ramatali (castanets), kabuji (cymbals) and the khanjani, a kind of tambourine. The dialogues and the songs in the performance are accompanied by lively, rhythmic music that combines elements of folk and classical Odissi music. Performances have little by way of dance or fight sequences, the action being limited by the jointless nature of the puppets, but the dramatic effect is elevated by the use of poetic language, music and the religious themes narrated. A full performance takes an entire week with a night each for each of the seven kandas of the Ramayana but in recent years performances have been shortened to only a few hours duration.

== Influence and changes ==
Puppet theatre in South East Asia is thought to have emerged from India and the Javanese puppet theatre of Wayang has its origins in the Rabana Chhaya. In recent years it has seen changes in both content and performances with contemporary social and health issues also forming the themes of the performances. A rare art form, efforts have been made under the Indira Gandhi National Centre for the Arts, Delhi to revive and promote it.

== See also ==
- Chadar Badar, puppet art of Santhal people of India
- Gopalila, puppet art of Odisha state of India
- Kathputli (puppetry), puppet art of Rajasthan state of India
- Nokkuvidya pavakali, puppet art of Kerala state of India
- Sakhi kandhei, string puppet art of Odisha state of India
- Shadow play, shadow puppet art which originated in first millennium BCE in India
- Tholpavakoothu, shadow puppet art of Kerala and Tami Nadu states of India
- Tholu bommalata, shadow puppet art of Andhra Pradesh state of India
- Togalu gombeyaata, shadow puppet art of Karnataka state of India
- Wayang, Indonesian and Malay equivalent
- Hun lakhon lek, Thai equivalent
- Nang yai, Thai equivalent
- Nang talung, Thai equivalent
