= Gopalila =

Puppetry drama of Odisha

Gopalila (Odia: ଗୋପଲୀଳା) also called as Krishnalila is a traditional form of itinerant glove - puppet theatre of Odisha state. The art of Gopalila is mainly concentrated in the coastal districts which includes, Cuttack, Puri, Kendrapara, Ganjam and Dhenkanal. Gopa refers to the "cowherd boys" in associated with the life of lord Krishna and Lila means "play". The puppeteers are Gopals belonging to the caste of cowherds. In religious occasions, especially Janmastami and Govardhan Puja, the puppeteers performed to entertain local villagers. Puppets are made of wood and paper and their bodies are padded with cloth. The lower half being covered with a long skirt. In southern Odisha, the puppets have legs which touch the ground; but in the north Odisha, the puppets are without legs.

Puppeteers usually travel in pairs from village to village carrying their basket of puppets with a small box like stage, large enough to mask the performer while he manipulates the puppets above his head. The second member of the party sits nearby, the pakhavaj playing the drum, a harmonium player support the performance, the singer singing and narrating incidents from the life of god krishna. But nowadays this tradition losing its popularity and few performers are active today.

== See also ==
- Chadar Badar, puppet art of Santhal people of India
- Kathputli (puppetry), puppet art of Rajasthan state of India
- Nokkuvidya pavakali, puppet art of Kerala state of India
- Rabana Chhaya, shadow puppet art of Odisha state of India
- Sakhi kandhei, string puppet art of Odisha state of India
- Shadow play, shadow puppet art which originated in first millennium BCE in India
- Tholpavakoothu, shadow puppet art of Kerala and Tami Nadu states of India
- Tholu bommalata, shadow puppet art of Andhra Pradesh state of India
- Togalu gombeyaata, shadow puppet art of Karnataka state of India
- Wayang, Indonesian and Malay equivalent
- Hun lakhon lek, Thai equivalent
- Nang yai, Thai equivalent
- Nang talung, Thai equivalent
