= Chadar Badar =

Tribal performing art in India

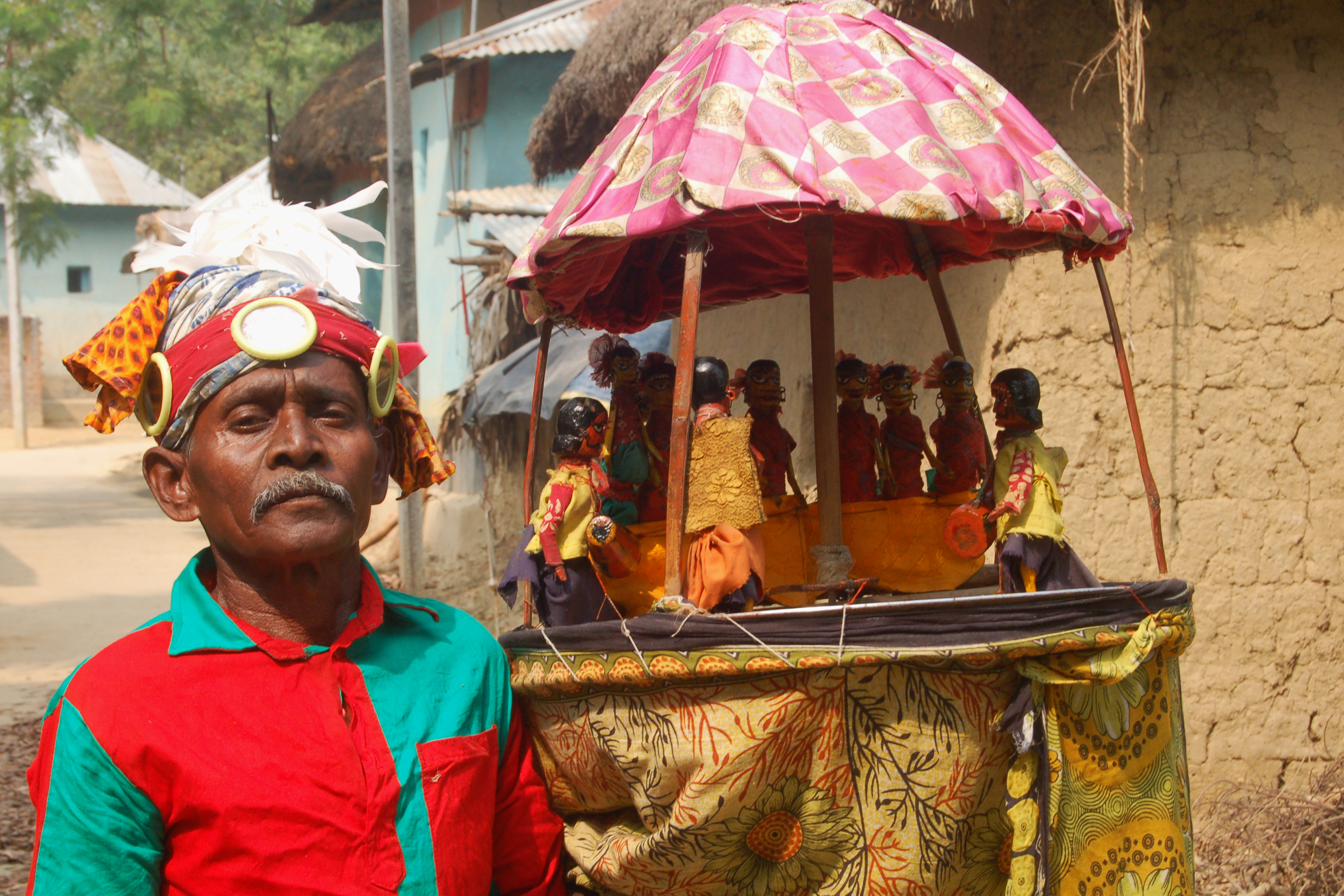
- Chadar Badar Puppet Folk Art
- Medium: Wooden puppets
- Types: Puppetry
- Originating culture: Santhal

Chadar Badar, also known as Santhal Puppetry, is a tribal performing art of the Santhal people, mainly found in the Indian states of Jharkhand, West Bengal, Odisha, Bihar and Assam. Once a dying art form, it was revived by the efforts of social activists such as Ravi Dwivedi and exponents like Sukan Mardi and Daman Murmu. The Government of West Bengal has set up a National Puppet Museum at Kankurgachi to preserve the art forms of puppetry including Chadar Badar.

Chadar Badar is performed with the assistance of wooden puppets hung inside a wooden box, open on three or four sides with curtains. The performer narrates stories by words and verse from ancient Santhal culture using the puppets, accompanied by tribal musical instruments. The painted puppets are 5 to 9 inches tall and has movable limbs, manipulated by the performer, using strings attached to them.

== See also ==
- Santhal people
- Gopalila, puppet art of Odisha state of India
- Kathputli (puppetry), puppet art of Rajasthan state of India
- Nokkuvidya pavakali, puppet art of Kerala state of India
- Rabana Chhaya, shadow puppet art of Odisha state of India
- Sakhi kandhei, string puppet art of Odisha state of India
- Shadow play, shadow puppet art which originated in first millennium BCE in India
- Tholpavakoothu, shadow puppet art of Kerala and Tami Nadu states of India
- Tholu bommalata, shadow puppet art of Andhra Pradesh state of India
- Togalu gombeyaata, shadow puppet art of Karnataka state of India
- Wayang, Indonesian and Malay equivalent
- Hun lakhon lek, Thai equivalent
- Nang yai, Thai equivalent
- Nang talung, Thai equivalent
