= Tholpavakoothu =

Form of shadow puppetry practiced in Tamil Nadu and Kerala, India

Tholpavakoothu (Malayalam:തോൽപ്പാവക്കൂത്ത്, Tamil:தோல்பாவைக்கூத்து) is a form of shadow puppetry that is practiced in Kerala and Tamil Nadu, India. It is performed using leather puppets and is performed in temples or in villages in specially built theatres. This form of art is especially popular in the Madurai and nearby districts of Madurai in Tamil Nadu and also in Palakkad, Thrissur and Malappuram districts of Kerala.

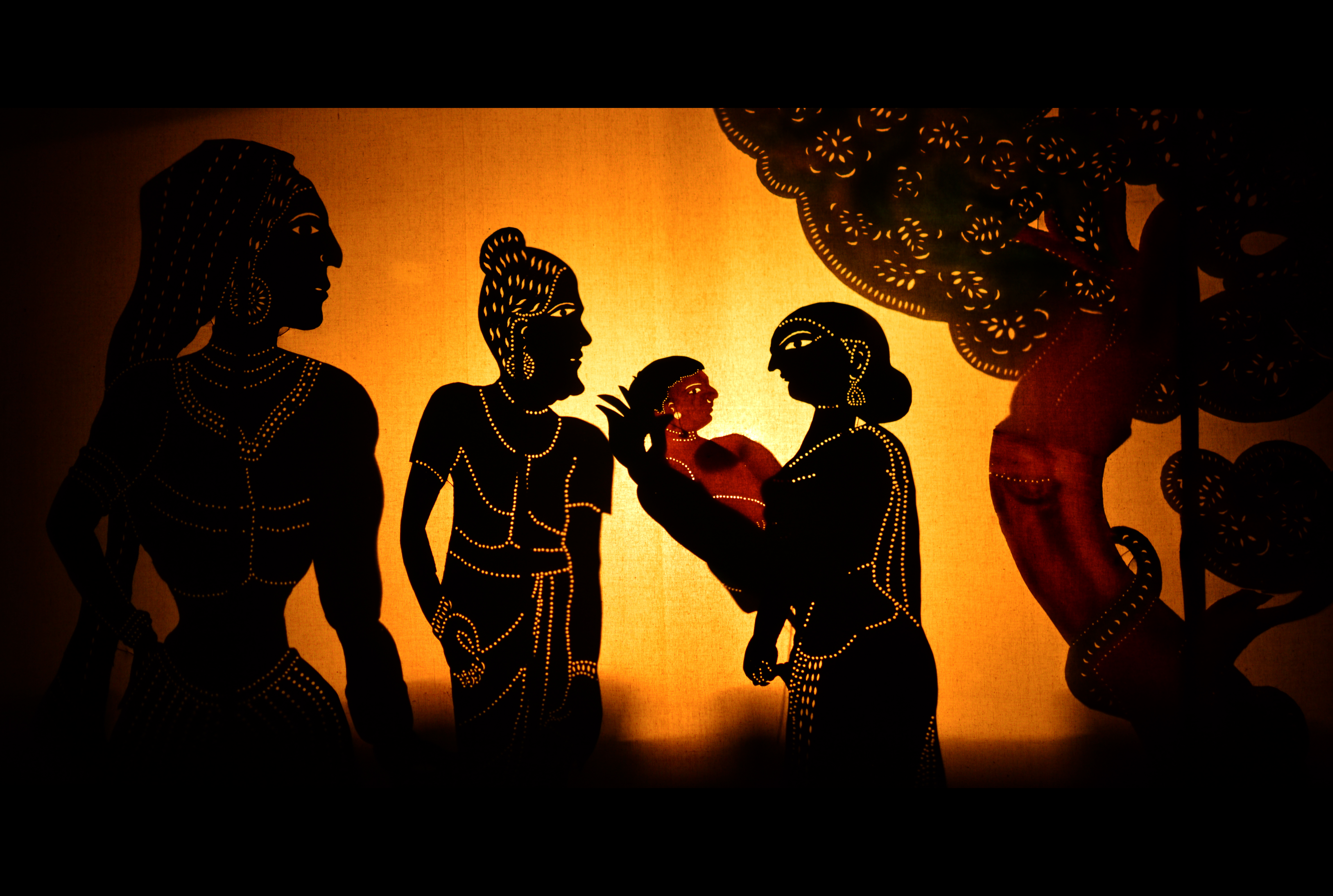
A scene from Tholpavakoothu

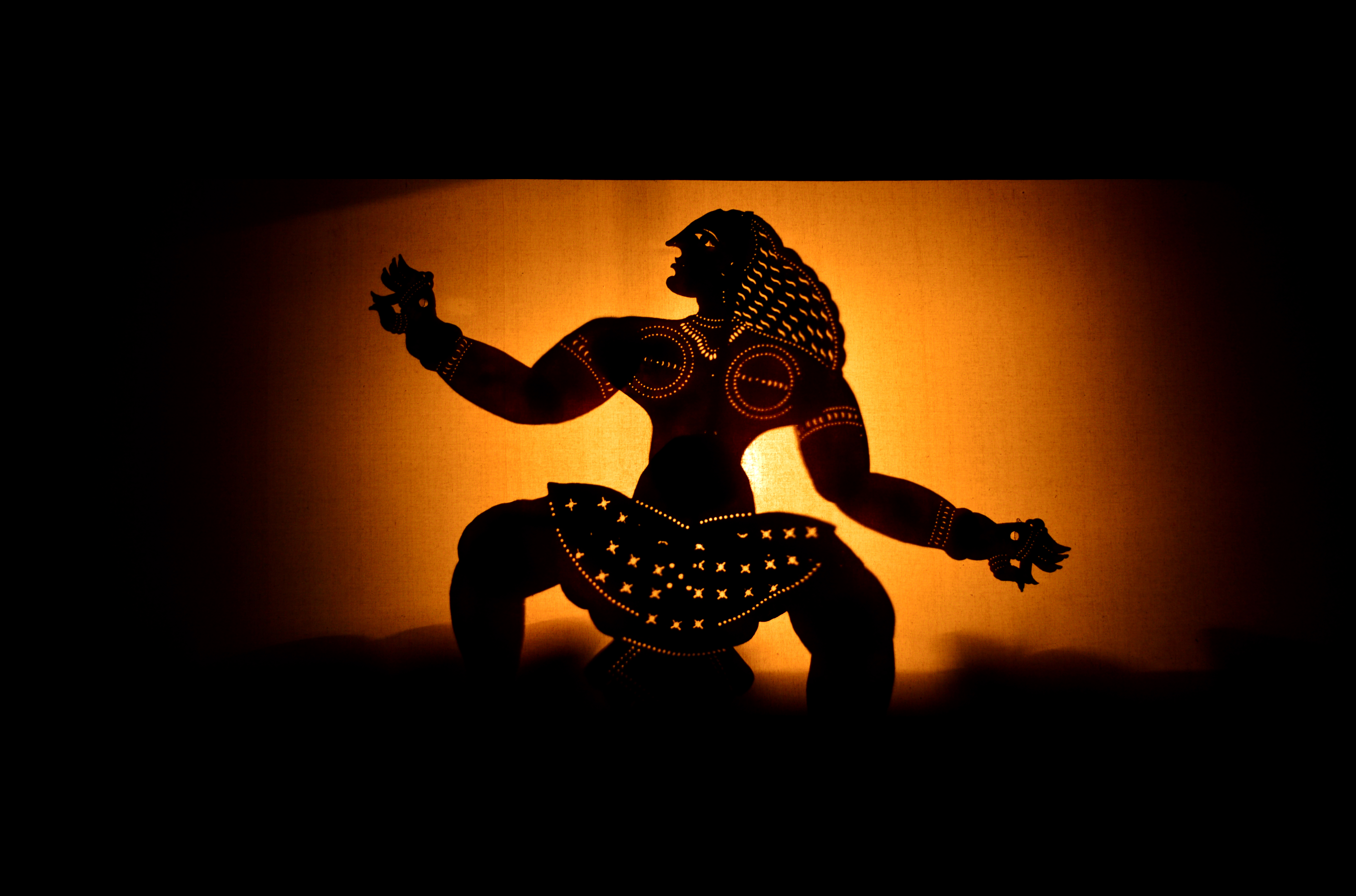
A scene from Tholpavakoothu

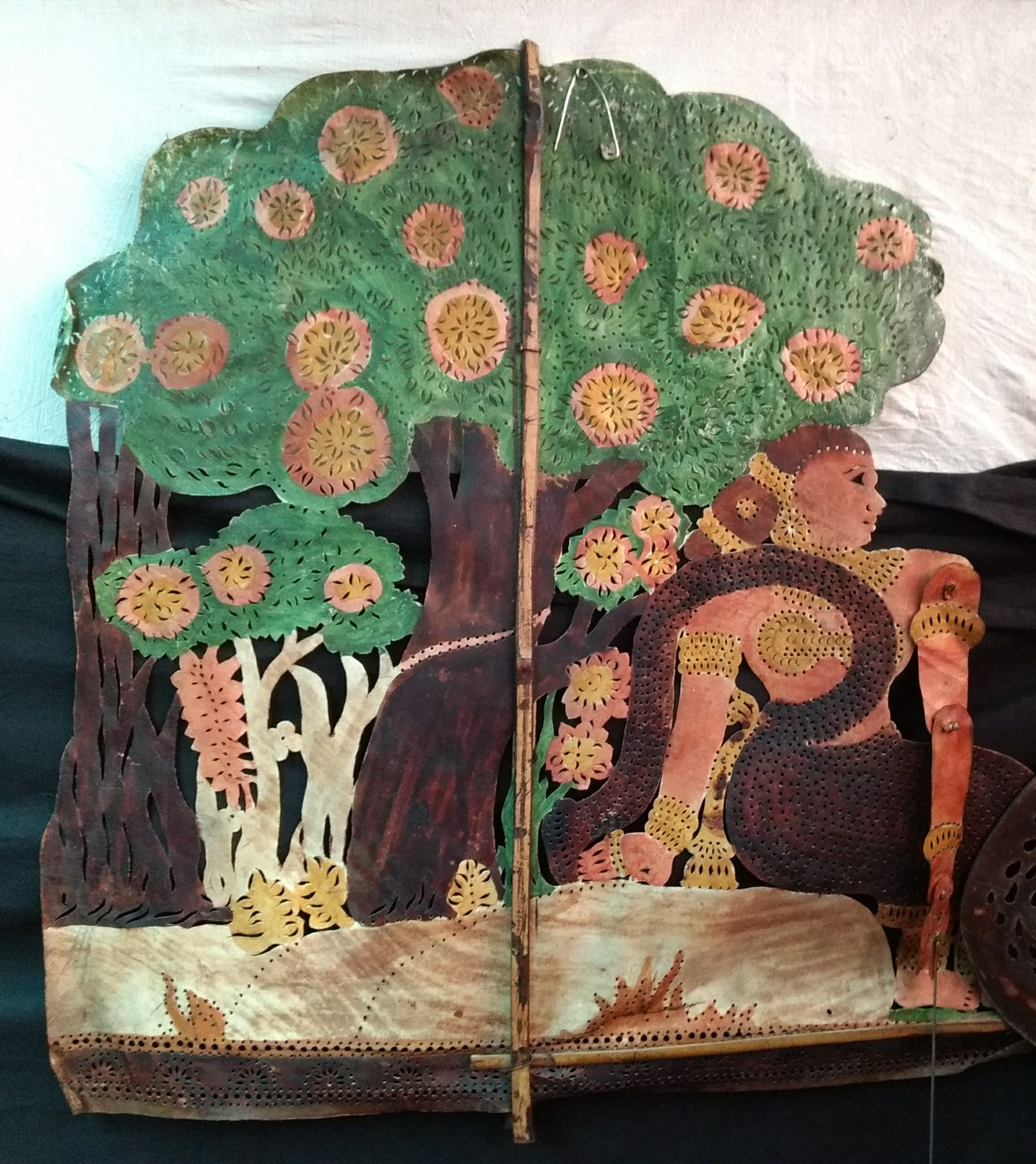
Puppet of Seeta, under the Asoka tree

Performance by Ramachandra pulavar and team at Govt. S.N.D.P.U.P. School, Pattathanam, Kollam.

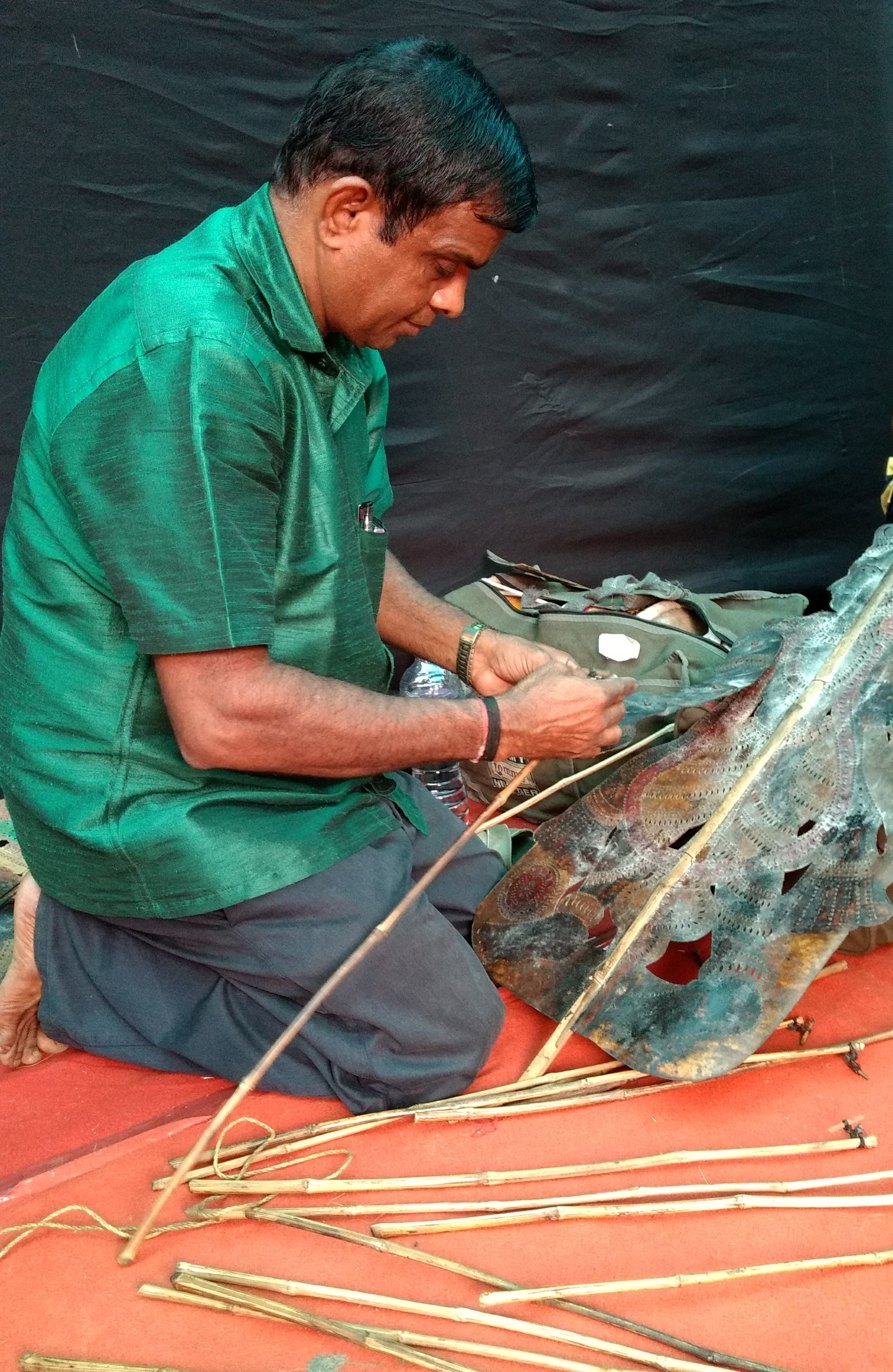
Ramachandra Pulavar preparing the puppets before the show, Mumbai, 2017

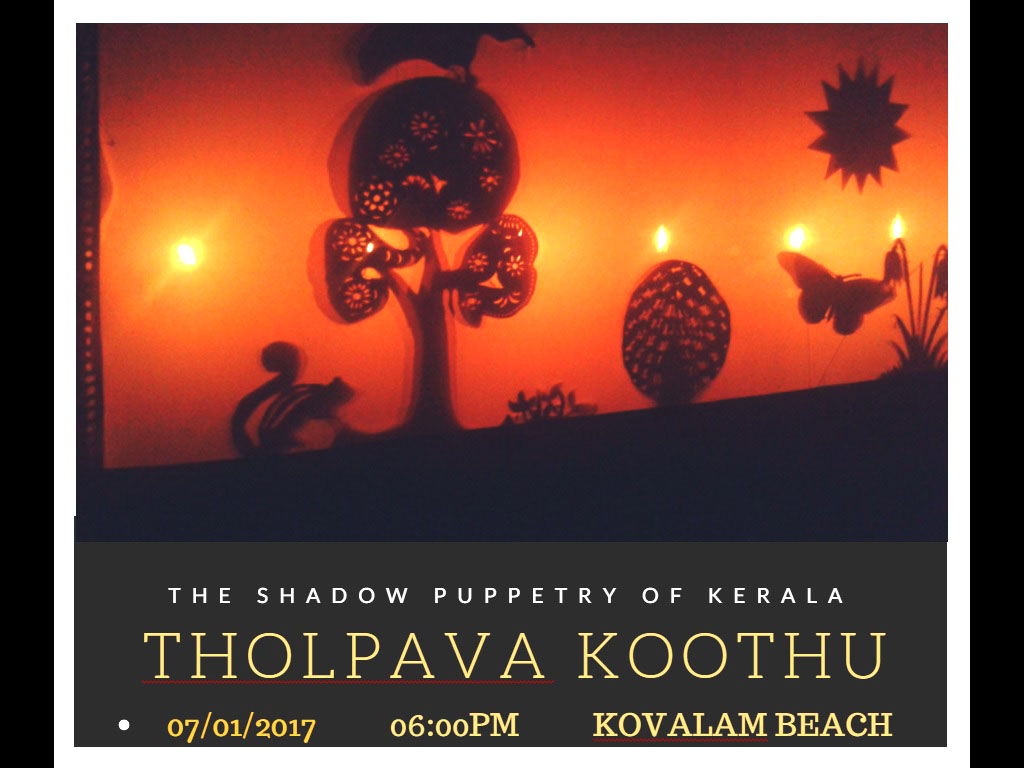
Tholpava koothu shadow puppet artists

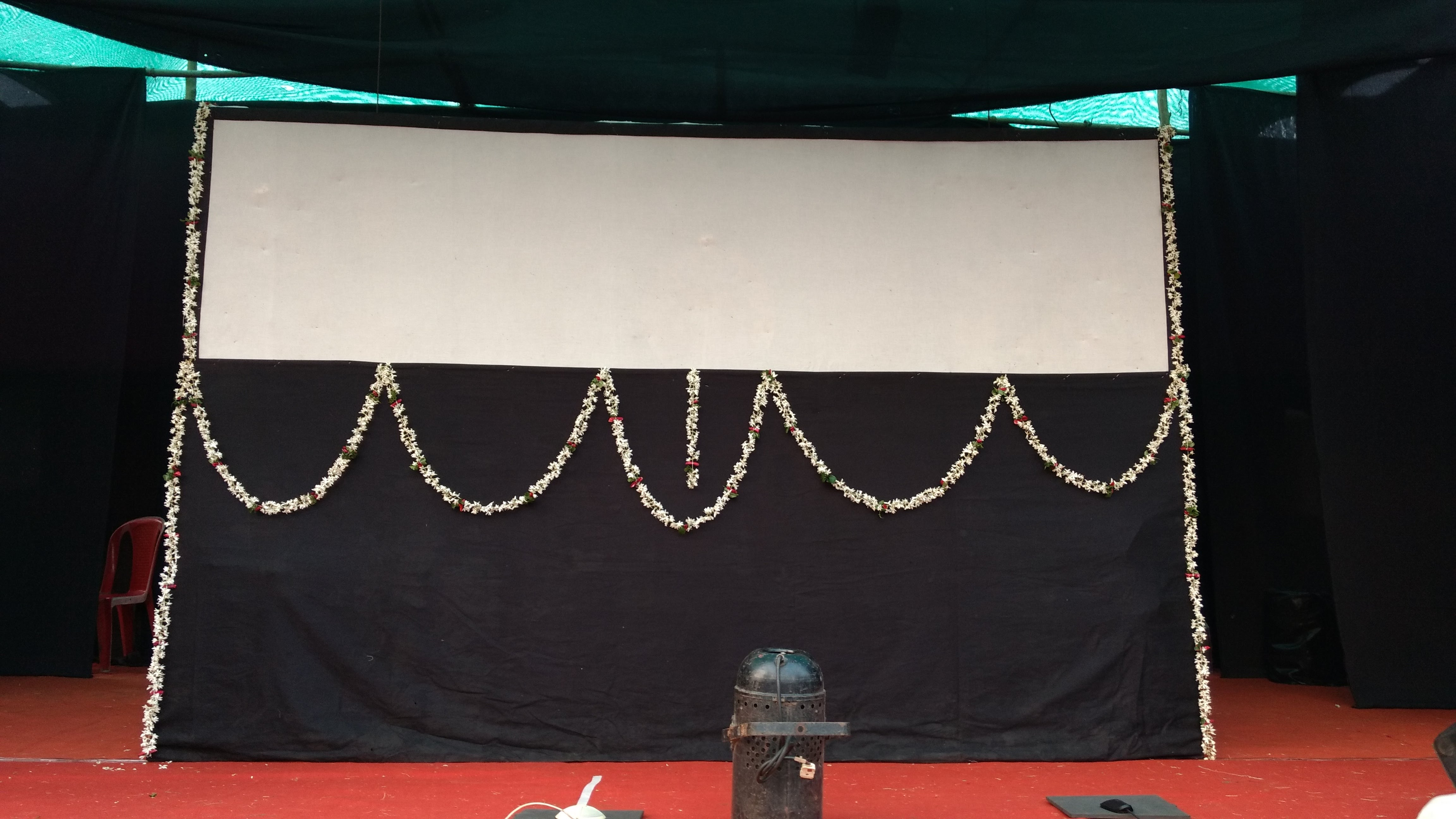
Koothumadam, prepared for a stage show

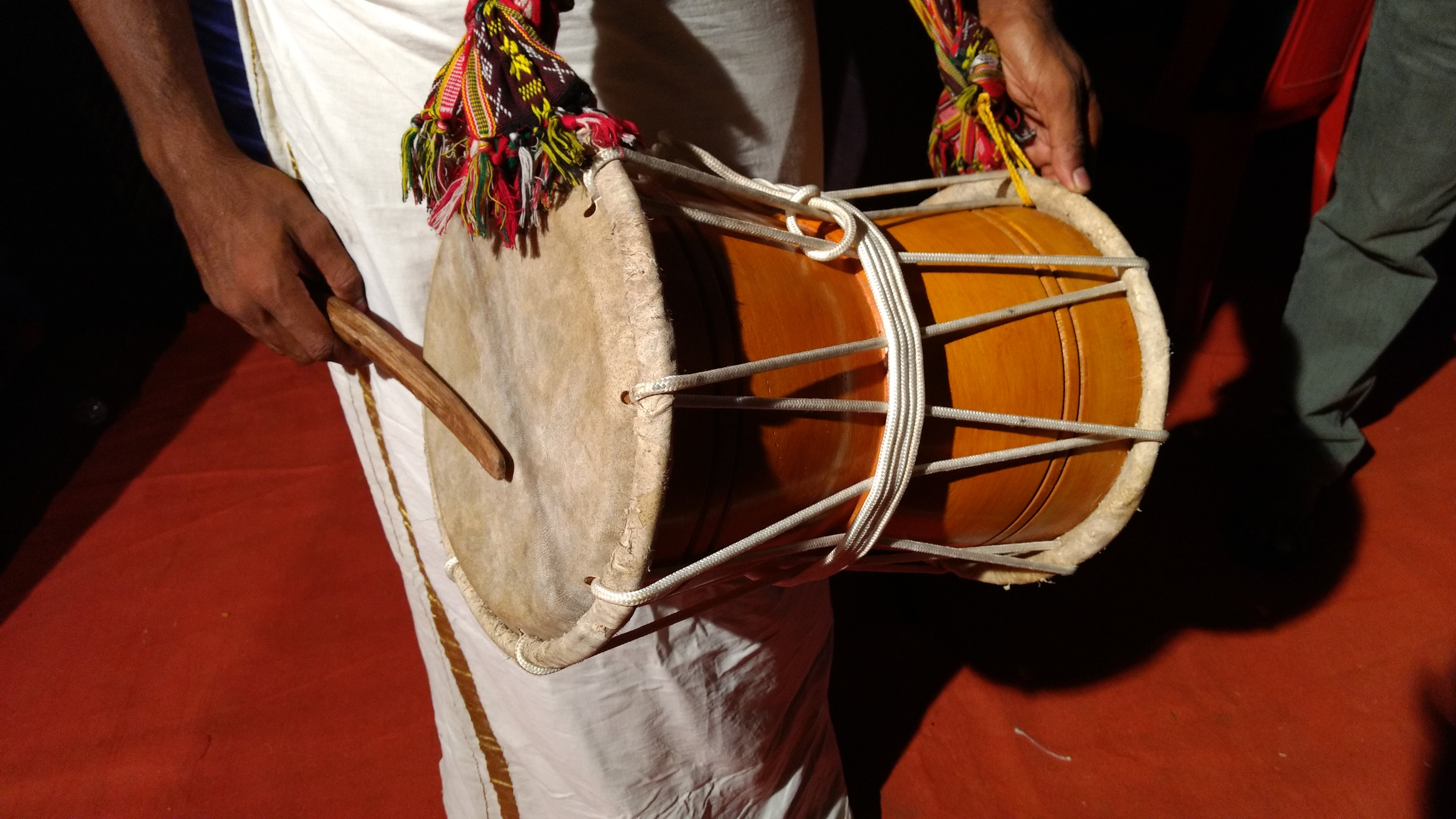
Ezhupara, a percussion instrument used in Tholpavakoothu

== History ==
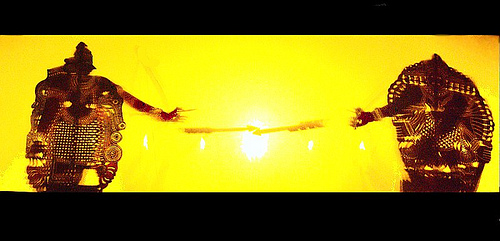
A battle scene from the Ramayana

Tholpavaikoothu is a compound word of three Tamil/Malayalam terms: தோல் (tōl) meaning leather, பாவை (pāvai) meaning doll and கூத்து (kūttu) meaning the play or drama. It is one of the two traditional Pavai Koothu that happened in southern India. The other one is "marappavaikoothu" also called bommalattam. The only variation is Bommalattam uses wooden dolls, while tholpavaikoothu uses Leather dolls. The earliest known mention of Pavaikoothu (both bommalattam and tholpavaikoothu) is in Thirukkural an ancient Tamil text of 300CE. The 1020th Kural mentions this. The performance language uses Tamil, Sanskrit and Malayalam words. Like Mudiyettu and Patayani, Tholpavakoothu is also an art form that is dedicated to Bhadrakali in Kerala. According to legend, Tholpavakoothu was performed at the request of Bhadrakali who could not witness Ravana's killing as she was fighting the demon Darika. Thus when it is performed in temples, an idol of the Goddess is usually placed on a pedestal in front of the arena where it is staged.

== Performances ==
A koothumadam is a separate 42-foot-long stage on which Tholpavakoothu is performed. The stage has a screen, a piece of white cloth, behind which the puppets are held. The lighting is provided by 21 lamps lit in coconut halves or earthen lamps placed behind the puppets, causing their shadows to fall on the screen. The lamps are a placed equidistantly on a specially constructed wooden beam called a vilakku madam. The performance is accompanied by the recitation of slokas and the performers are required to learn over 3000 of these before they perform. The recitation is accompanied by instruments such as chenda, maddalam, ezhupara, ilathalam, conch and cherukuzhal.

A full Tholpavakoothu performance, staging all the episodes of the Kamba Ramayana, takes 21 days to complete with nine-hour performances every day, and requires 180 to 200 puppets. A full performance needs up to 40 artistes. The lead puppeteer is called a pulavar. Traditionally, performances begin at night and go on till dawn. The show begins with a kelikottu and an invocation called kalarichinthu. Performances are done from January through May and during poorams. A Tholpavakoothu performance can last 7, 14, 21, 41 or 71 days depending on the tradition at the temple where it is performed. It continues to be performed in over a hundred temples across Kerala.

== Puppets ==
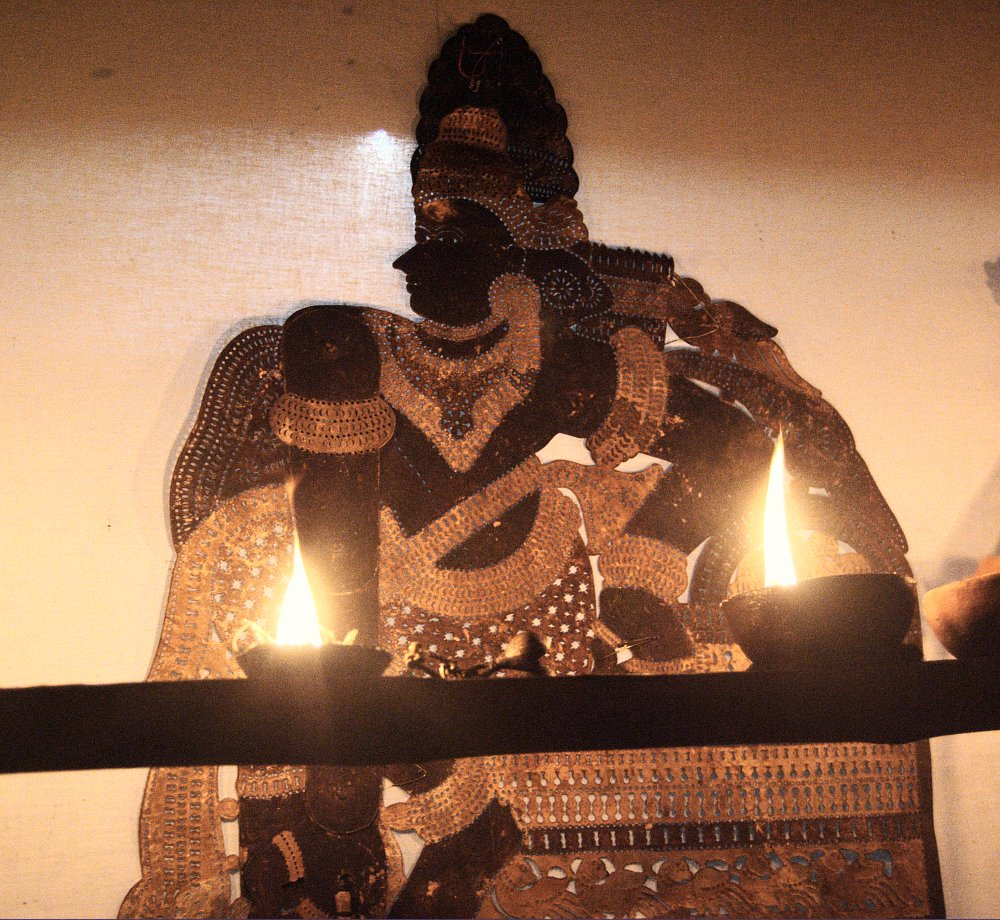
Tholpavakoothu puppet as seen from behind the screen

The puppets used in Tholpavakoothu used to be made out of deerskin but are now typically made from goatskin. The puppets are painted in vegetable dyes, as these dyes last long. Some puppets can be as tall as four feet. The puppets are controlled using two sticks; the puppeteer holds the puppet in one hand while its limbs are manipulated using a thinner stick held in the puppeteer's other hand.

== Puppeteers ==
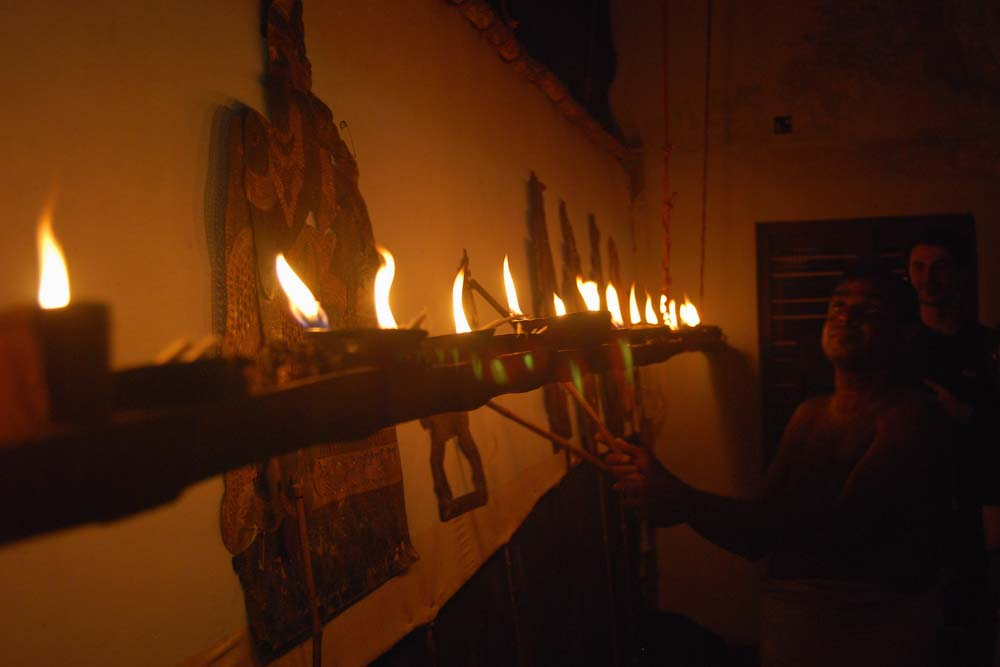
A Tholpavakoothu performance

The lead puppeteer is usually a pulavar which is an honorific given to a puppeteer who is also a scholar. Pulavars undergo intensive training in puppetry and have a deep knowledge of Malayalam, Tamil and Sanskrit. Puppeteers have to study the Kamba Ramayana and be well read in the vedas and puranas, Ayurveda, and be trained in classical music. However, some puppeteers forgo classical music as it entails several years of study to master. It can take anywhere from 6 to 10 years of rigorous training for a puppeteer to fully master this art and be able to perform it. K. K. Ramachandra Pulavar was the leading puppeteer in Kerala. He was born into a traditional family with a rich historical background; he had studied Tholpavakoothu by his great guru/father from the age of six.

== Threats and new trends ==
Tholpavakoothu, like many traditional art forms, has been facing the threat of extinction due to the arrival of alternate platforms of entertainment such as television and cinema and due to changing cultural values. The younger generation have increasingly failed to take up this art form as it is highly demanding and does not pay much. The audience for these shows have dwindled even in rural Kerala. To cope up with these social changes, the duration of many performances have been drastically reduced. Thematically, puppeteers have begun to introduce contemporary and secular themes to appeal to the youth. Themes such as ragging, communal amity and stories from India's freedom struggle have been featured in recent years. Performances are no longer confined only to temples but are also held in secular venues such as colleges and at the International Film Festival of Kerala.

== See also ==
- Chadar Badar, puppet art of Santhal people of India
- Gopalila, puppet art of Odisha state of India
- Kathputli (puppetry), puppet art of Rajasthan state of India
- Nokkuvidya pavakali, puppet art of Kerala state of India
- Rabana Chhaya, shadow puppet art of Odisha state of India
- Sakhi kandhei, string puppet art of Odisha state of India
- Shadow play, shadow puppet art which originated in first millennium BCE in India
- Tholu bommalata, shadow puppet art of Andhra Pradesh state of India
- Togalu gombeyaata, shadow puppet art of Karnataka state of India
- Wayang, Indonesian and Malay equivalent
- Hun lakhon lek, Thai equivalent
- Nang yai, Thai equivalent
- Nang talung, Thai equivalent
