= Sakhi kandhei =

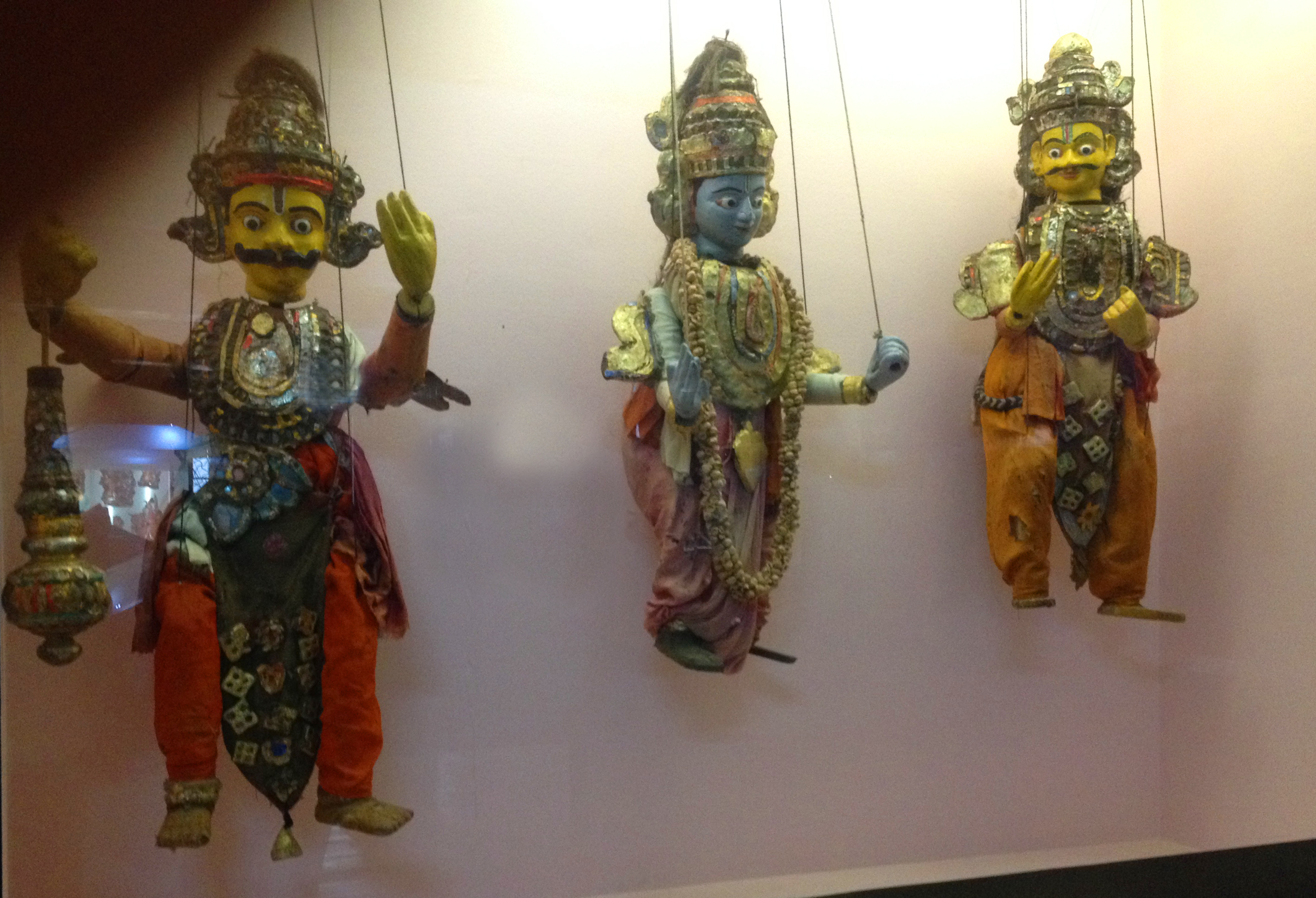
Sakhi Kandhei of Odisha preserved in Raja Dinkar Kelkar Museum, Pune

Sakhi kandhei (Also sakhi kundhei, sakhi nata) is a string puppetry show popular in the Indian state of Odisha, especially in the Kendrapara district of Odisha. This form of art is still performed by local artists in and around Palakana, a small village in Kendrapara. Puppeteers generally form groups and travel from village to village for performing shows. Wooden dolls are tied to strings which are controlled by pulling and releasing the strings. Different expressions by pulling the strings narrate tales from the Puranas and modern social life. A group of artists perform music and give background voice for the narration of stories.

Considering sakhi kandhei a dying art form, Odisha Sangeet Natak Akademi is taking steps to popularize and revive it. A handful of puppeteers have taken initiatives to revive this art form.

I carve out wooden puppets on orders received from puppet show operators. The dolls made by me fetch money, in addition to what I earn by staging the shows.

— Fakir Singh, puppeteer from Palakana

== Puppets ==
Wooden puppets are used in Sakhi kandhei which have three pieces; head and the two hands with the wrists with hole in them to insert fingers. The three pieces are joined together and long sleeved dresses are used to cover the bodies. Strings are attached to the thumb, limbs and other body parts which are pulled and released to give rhythmic gesture based on the story's narratives.

It’s a tough battle to keep the art alive when more attractive means of entertainment are bombarded round the clock on the electronic media. So, the question is how long these handful of artistes will be able to carry on the ancient traditional art to future generations.

— Basudeb Das, Puppetry researcher

== See also ==
- Chadar Badar, puppet art of Santhal people of India
- Gopalila, puppet art of Odisha state of India
- Kathputli (puppetry), puppet art of Rajasthan state of India
- Nokkuvidya pavakali, puppet art of Kerala state of India
- Rabana Chhaya, shadow puppet art of Odisha state of India
- Shadow play, shadow puppet art which originated in first millennium BCE in India
- Tholpavakoothu, shadow puppet art of Kerala and Tami Nadu states of India
- Tholu bommalata, shadow puppet art of Andhra Pradesh state of India
- Togalu gombeyaata, shadow puppet art of Karnataka state of India
- Wayang, Indonesian and Malay equivalent
- Hun lakhon lek, Thai equivalent
- Nang yai, Thai equivalent
- Nang talung, Thai equivalent

== See also ==
- Kathputli (Puppet)
- Puppetry
