= Togalu gombeyaata =

Puppet theatre of Karnataka, India

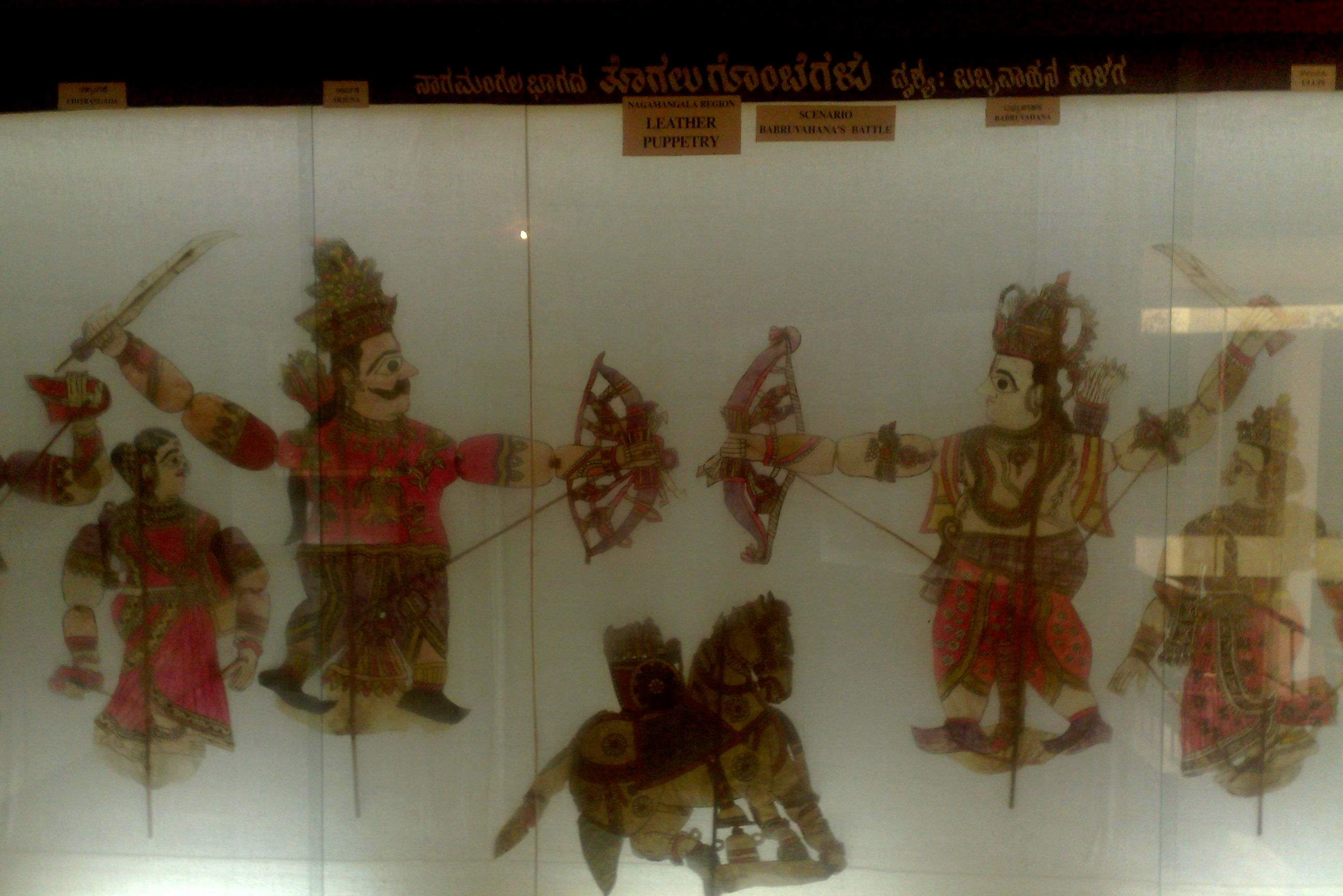
Leather puppets demonstrating the war between the Pandava, Arjuna and his son Babruvahana

Togalu gombeyaata is a puppet show unique to the state of Karnataka, India. Togalu gombeyaata translates to "a play of leather dolls" in the native language of Kannada. It is a form of shadow puppetry. Karnataka Chitrakala Parishat has undertaken research on this art and has a good collection of leather puppets.

== History ==
Togalu gombeyaata is one of the seven shadow puppetry artform of Southern India. Scholars believed that this tradition has also migrated from India to Sri Lanka, Indonesia and rest of the Asia. Several evidence from historic texts such as Mahabhasya and Mahabharat from 2nd Century suggests that the art of shadow puppetry or similar art forms have existed since first Millennium BC. In Karnataka, the art of shadow puppetry received royal patronage in the 2nd century and further by Rashtrakutas in 10th century followed by Vijayanagara Empire in the 15th century. The art form spread in other parts of the country such as Odisha and Maharashtra during the reign of Rashtrakutas as they expanded their empire.

The peak of Togalu gombeyaata was during the Vijayanagara Empire. After this an influx of Turkish Puppetry happened during the establishment of Bahmani, Kingdom which influenced the ornamentation and styling of the puppets. After the decline of Bahmani Kingdom the patronage for the art form shrunk significantly and the performances were limited to villages and temple complex, as seen today.

== Making of the puppet ==
The puppets used in togalu gombeyaata are made of leather. Goat hide and deer skin are generally used for making these puppets since they have the characteristic of transparency and can easily absorb colours. The raw hide is treated with salt and caustic soda to remove hair and other impurities and then dried. Then colours are applied on the leather using locally available vegetable dyes. Red, blue, green and black colours are usually used. The hide is then cut into appropriate shapes which are joined using strings and small sticks. For puppets representing human and animal figures, the head and limbs are joined in such a way that they can be moved easily. The maximum size of the puppet is 4 x 3 feet and the minimum is 6 x 3 inches. The puppets are usually characters from the Hindu epics, the Ramayana and Mahabharata. More recently, personalities such as Mahatma Gandhi have also been created using puppets.

== Stage and settings ==
Traditionally the performance is organised outside the villages in reserved or in temple courtyards. stage is set up using bamboo stems and woollen blankets. A white, semi-transparent cloth is strung across the stage to serve as a screen on which the images of the puppets are projected. The puppets are strung across a rope behind the screen and a bright oil lamp placed behind the puppets projects their shadows on to the screen. The puppeteers sit behind the screen and manipulate the puppets based on the scene being played. However, innovation has entered this art with the usage of steel frames for the stage, loudspeakers to amplify voices, and an arc lamp instead of the oil lamp.

== Performance ==
Most of the scenes enacted are usually those belonging to the Hindu epics, the Ramayana, Mahabharata, the Puranas and folklores.

The performance usually starts with an invocation to the Hindu god Ganesha placed under a tree, surrounded by peacock, rooster and parrots accompanied by Hindu goddess of learning Saraswati, clowns Killikyeta and his wife Bagarakka. The puppeteers also provide voice to the puppets and an accompanying music is provided using a mukha-veena (a veena played by mouth) or a harmonium. The puppets are held by bamboo rod which fits in it vertically, a thinner stick is attached to the moveable parts of the figure, mainly the arms and the head. The performances usually commence at night and continue till dawn.

== See also ==
- Chadar Badar, puppet art of Santhal people of India
- Gopalila, puppet art of Odisha state of India
- Kathputli (puppetry), puppet art of Rajasthan state of India
- Nokkuvidya pavakali, puppet art of Kerala state of India
- Rabana Chhaya, shadow puppet art of Odisha state of India
- Sakhi kandhei, string puppet art of Odisha state of India
- Shadow play, shadow puppet art which originated in first millennium BCE in India
- Tholpavakoothu, shadow puppet art of Kerala and Tami Nadu states of India
- Tholu bommalata, shadow puppet art of Andhra Pradesh state of India
- Wayang, Indonesian and Malay equivalent
- Hun lakhon lek, Thai equivalent
- Nang yai, Thai equivalent
- Nang talung, Thai equivalent
