= Tholu bommalata =

Shadow puppet theatre of Andhra Pradesh and Telangana, India

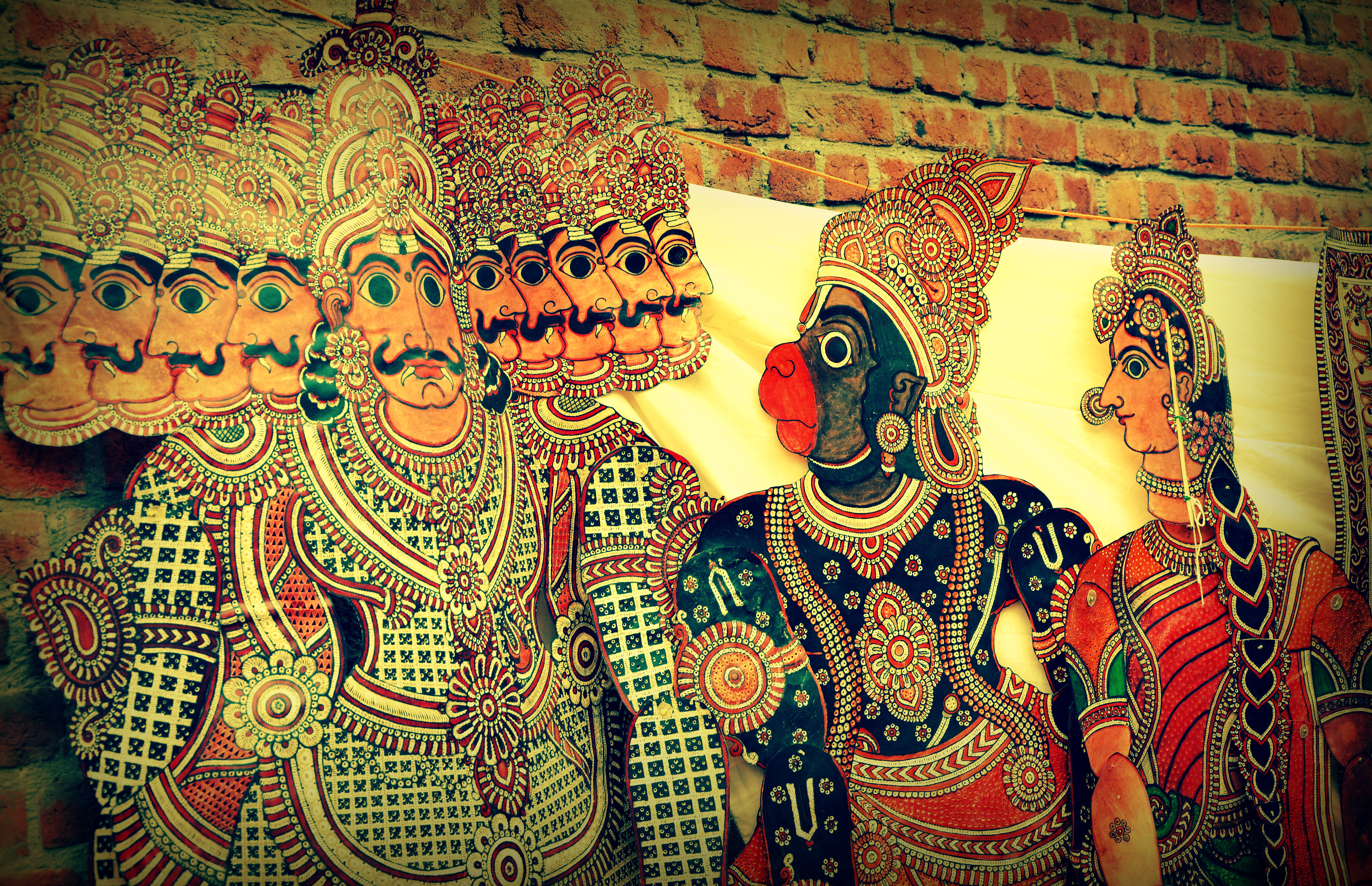
Hanuman and Ravana in Tholu bommalata, the shadow puppet tradition of Andhra Pradesh

Tholu bommalata is the shadow puppet theatre tradition of the state of Andhra Pradesh in India with roots dating back to the 3rd century BCE. Its performers are part of a group of wandering entertainers and peddlers who pass through villages during the course of a year and offer to sing ballads, tell fortunes, sell amulets, perform acrobatics, charm snakes, weave fishnets, tattoo local people and mend pots. Tholu bommalata has a history of consistent royal patronage. It is a predecessor to Wayang.

This ancient custom, which for centuries before radio, film, and television provided knowledge of Hindu epics, local folk tales and news, spread throughout the Indian subcontinent. The puppeteers are some of the various entertainers who perform all night and usually reenact various stories from Hindu epics such as the Ramayana and Mahabharata.

== Etymology ==
Tholu bommalata in Telugu literally means "the dance of leather puppets" (tholu – "leather", bomma – "puppet/doll" and aata – "play/dance"). It is also translated as "the play of leather dolls" or "the dance of leather dolls".

== History ==
Andhra history records that shadow puppetry was in vogue during the Satavahana period (2nd century BCE–2nd century CE). Art critics opine that the puppetry spread from Andhra to Indonesia, Cambodia, Malaysia, Thailand, Burma. Wayang, the Indonesian puppet theatre play which has been a staple of Indonesian tourism and designated by UNESCO as Intangible Cultural Heritage of Humanity, has its origins in Tholu bommalata. Some of the shadow plays are improvised based on Ranganatha Ramayanamu (c. 1300 CE).

== Tholu Bommalaata ==
The performance begins with a series of sung invocations and a line of ornate, stylized puppets pinned in overlapping fashion onto the sides of the screen. The puppets are mounted in the middle on a palm stem, extended to form a handle used to move the body of the puppet. Their articulated arms are moved with detachable sticks that have a small piece of string with a peg at the end, which slip into holes on the hands. Generally, one puppeteer manipulates all three sticks of a single puppet, holding the central handle stick in one hand and two arm-control sticks in the other. Often two to three puppeteers operate puppets on the screen at the same time, each one delivering the lines for his or her own puppet.

As the players manipulate the puppets, placing them on the screen and then moving them away, they create the illusion of the figures suddenly materializing and then fading out. They also cause the figures to walk, sway, hop, and fly through the air. They can swivel a dancer's detachable head and manipulate its hands while keeping its hips swaying to create an illusion of twirling.

The puppeteers accompany the character's speeches with animated movement of the arms and hands, which they can flip over to create a three-dimensional effect. The swaying of freely dangling legs also adds to the feeling of animation. When several puppets are stationary on the screen at the same time, they can be pinned to the screen with date palm thorns. A puppet can be rapidly pinned with one or two of the long, thin thorns passed through perforations in a headdress or shoulder ornaments. Such puppets are still able to engage in animated conversation by means of the sticks moving their hands. Characters that engage in rough fighting, such as the monkey king Hanuman or the jesters, are often held from the hip, enabling them to be moved with greater control than by the central stick alone.

Every few minutes throughout the performance, the action will be broken by the episodes of broad comic relief from the jesters speaking in a slangy, quirky style and engaging in slapstick antics. Some of these depend on puns or risqué allusions. Except for certain commonly used expletives, their language is not obscene, though sequences may be bawdy to a degree not observed in other popular forms of entertainment.

Interspersed with spoken dialogue, verse passages in literary Telugu and Sanskrit are sung with instrumental accompaniment. These occur especially in contexts of heightened emotion or important events. The players serve as their own musicians and all members of the troupe know the music that accompanies the various passages.

=== Musical instruments ===
The musical instrumentation consist of a harmonium, a portable keyboard organ that sometimes serves only as a drone; a long, two-headed South Indian drum with tapering ends (mrudangam); strings of bells worn on the ankles and wrists; and pairs of finger cymbals. A wooden shoe with stilts is used to keep its wearer above the mud during the rainy season, and can be struck against schoolchildren's seating planks to create dramatic clacking and banging sound effects for fight scenes.

The singing style and the conventions of vocal delivery that accompany tholu bommalata closely resemble the form of singing from an older drama genre known as Satyabhamakalapam. Accompanied only by the drum and finger cymbals, the player sings raising his hand up to one ear, as if to listen to what he is singing.

=== Puppet making ===
Three types of skins have been used to manufacture puppets: antelope, spotted deer and goat. Antelope skins are reserved for making a limited number of auspicious characters, such as the gods and epic heroes. Deer skin, noted for its strength and resistance to rough handling, is employed in the figures of the warrior Bhima and the ten-headed demon king Ravana. All other puppets are typically made from goat skin, readily available locally. Most puppets are made from a single skin, though some require more. At least four skins are necessary for Ravana – one for his body, one for his legs, and one to make each set of five arms. The puppets are made from 'nonviolent leather', that is the skin of animals that died a natural death is used rather than slaughtering animals for their skin.

== Current state of affairs ==
The shadow play is only one set of techniques for dramatizing Hindu epics. Motion pictures and television, have adapted the epics for the electronic age. Shadow puppets continue to be a part of South Asian art and drama.

Currently the Tholu Bommalatta toys and other accessories are produced in the village of Nimmalkunta in Andhra Pradesh.

== See also ==
- Chadar Badar, puppet art of Santhal people of India
- Gopalila, puppet art of Odisha state of India
- Kathputli (puppetry), puppet art of Rajasthan state of India
- Nokkuvidya pavakali, puppet art of Kerala state of India
- Rabana Chhaya, shadow puppet art of Odisha state of India
- Sakhi kandhei, string puppet art of Odisha state of India
- Shadow play, shadow puppet art which originated in first millennium BCE in India
- Tholpavakoothu, shadow puppet art of Kerala and Tami Nadu states of India
- Togalu gombeyaata, shadow puppet art of Karnataka state of India
- Wayang, Indonesian and Malay equivalent
- Hun lakhon lek, Thai equivalent
- Nang yai, Thai equivalent
- Nang talung, Thai equivalent
