= Anurag Chauhan =

Indian social worker

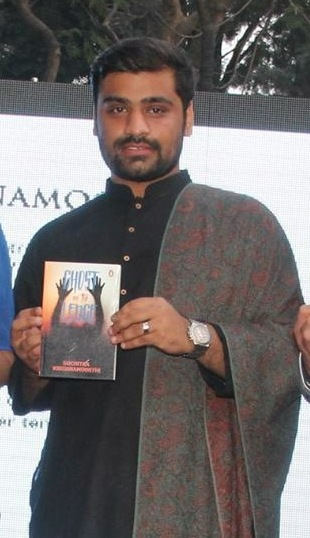
- Chauhan at DLF 2017
- Born: 15 July 1994 (age 32); Dehradun, Uttarakhand, India
- Other names: PadMan, PadWarrior
- Education: Master of social work
- Occupations: Social worker, entrepreneur
- Years active: 2010–present
- Organization: Humans For Humanity
- Known for: Social Activism, Social Entrepreneurship
- Television: Kaun Banega Crorepati
- Movement: The WASH Project
- Parent(s): Vijaylaxmi Chauhan; Bharat Singh Chauhan
- Awards: Karamveer Chakra by United Nations
- Website: humansforhumanity.online

Anurag Chauhan (born 1994) is an Indian social worker and founder of Humans For Humanity, a non-governmental organization (NGO) headquartered in Dehradun, India He is known for social work, particularly with regards to menstrual hygiene. The WASH project started by him has reached over 3.5 million women in over 6 states in last 5 years.

He has been in the field of social work from the age of 14. During the COVID-19 pandemic, he provided aid & essentials to over 8000 families in various parts of the country, supporting communities, low income group families, trans men, widows, maids, etc. Humans For Humanity has started employment generation programs to uplift and empower communities, making them financially stable & independent even during the pandemic. The WASH project which is a pilot project of the organization has been working to promote menstrual hygiene among the women of rural areas of six states of the country including Uttarakhand, Delhi, Rajasthan, Haryana and others, decided to work on the initiative for trans men since last year.

== Works ==
In 2015, Chauhan started a project called WASH (Women, Sanitation, Hygiene) that works to educate women about menstrual hygiene, providing sanitary napkins and training them to make bio-degradable sanitary napkins. Workshops led by doctors inform women about biological reasons behind menstruation, hormonal changes, from teen age changes to menopause. Counselling is given to women particularly who are dealing with menopause. Nutritionists are part of the effort- informing women and girls about importance of food & nutrition intake. Affordability and sustainability are big issues, which is why they train the women to make their own sanitary napkins at home. The workshop also covers the harmful effects of poor menstrual hygiene and teach about the disposal of napkins. In 2018, WASH started Breaking The Bloody Taboo campaign where, as the name suggests, Anurag and his team strive to strip women of the age-old taboos. During one such campaign in Rajasthan, the volunteers conducted a session inside a temple with women of menstruating age. In another session, Anurag handed over tulsi saplings to women and asked them to nurture the sapling for a month and then see the results.

Chauhan started this project after reading an article written about deaths caused due to lack of menstruation hygiene. His cause received support from actress Twinkle Khanna.

Chauhan runs awareness programs in many villages, slums, schools and colleges of Uttarakhand, Delhi, Rajasthan, Uttar Pradesh, Maharashtra and Karnataka.

During the nationwide lockdown Humans for Humanity helped women by teaching them how to make sanitary napkins at home. Anurag is known as an example of how youth of India are breaking the stereotype associated with menstrual hygiene by touching lives of those who need awareness and education by honesty, dedication and a will do bring a positive change. Stigmas, combined with financial restraints, further add to the neglected state of menstrual health. The WASH project by Humans For Humanity works in six states and has employed women from the villages. The eco friendly, reusable cloth pads last up to 2-2.5 years and come as part of a kit that also has liners, undergarments, soap bars & a guide. Hundreds of community workers, women, self help groups & ngos have been given online workshop to make sanitary napkins by Humans For Humanity during the lockdown..

During the lockdown he fed over 8000 families throughout the pandemic in various slums and villages of the country, particularly the artists community of Kathputli Colony living in Anand Parvat, which is a transit camp. Amid the COVID-19 pandemic that has forced schools to adopt online teaching, Humans For Humanity is trying to leverage the new normal by introducing traditional puppetry in the teaching process to present the children with an innovative way of learning and revive the centuries-old traditional art form. As the lockdown lifted in New Delhi, Anurag started an employment generation project for the street artists connecting them with schools and generating income through online classes/performances. The project is helping save the dying Street art and provide livelihood to many street artists.

In April 2022, Chauhan launched the WASH project in Telangana and has successfully conducted menstrual hygiene management & health workshops in many villages such as Challur village, Pochampalli village, Ghanmukla village, Reddipalli village, Keshavpatnam, and many more.

== Other ==
Chauhan acted in a film as a lead actor, shot in Rajasthan. The film is centered around Clean India Campaign, an initiative by PM Narendra Modi.

In September, 2017, Chauhan started an online social media campaign, #TheDoorChallenge, to promote rich Indian cultural heritage and traditional Indian attire among youngsters. The challenge went viral and was well received by an international audience and garnered support from many countries such as Australia, Canada and Bangladesh.

In April, 2020, Chauhan started India's 1st online Virtual Literature Festival, during the nationwide lockdown due to coronavirus, to promote rich Indian cultural heritage, literature and arts among the people stuck at home. The festival was very well received by a huge audience and garnered people's support from all walks of life. His efforts were applauded by the audiences for taking an initiative to bring out content that helped many during the time they felt low & lonely. Actress Lisa Ray, Laxmi Agarwal, Bollywood choreographer Sandip Soparrkar, Shobhaa De, Sonal Mansingh, Divya Dutta were amongst many others who participated in the fest. In June, 2020 the Virtual Literature Festival was launched as a Poscast series by Chauhan with RedFM on multiple platforms such RedFM app, Google Podcasts, Apple Podcasts, Spotify & JioSaavn.

In June, 2020 Chauhan launched a virtual series called Women of India in collaboration with UN Women to talk about various topics concerning women. The inaugural session was attended by Kiran Bedi.

In the month of October & November Chauhan appeared on Kaun Banega Crorepati multiple times, airing on Sony TV as an Expert.

During the show, Anurag was introduced by host Amitabh Bachchan. Amitabh gave an insight into Anurag's NGO, ‘Human’s for Humanity’, and spoke about how the latter has been working on educating the masses and spreading awareness on menstrual hygiene. During the ‘Expert Advice’ lifeline in the show, Anurag was called upon by Bachchan to assist the contestants on the hot seat.

Humans For Humanity started Red Cloth Campaign during the pandemic, to spread awareness about menstruation & bust the taboos. Actor Lisa Ray and singer-actor Shibani Dandekar, Kirti Kulhari, Kubra Sait, Divya Seth supported the campaign along with thousands of social media users.

== Awards and recognition ==
- Karmaveer Chakra Award by the United Nations, 2016
- Bharat Nirman Award by Najma Heptulla, the Union Minister of India, at the India International Centre, 2016
- Delhi Achievers Award 2015 by Aaj Ki Delhi magazine
- Chauhan was honoured with the International Women Empowerment Award 2019 by IWES, Ministry of Women and Child Development, Government of India, Ministry of Drinking Water and Sanitation, Government of India and UNICEF.
- Awarded a medal & Global Fellowship by United Nations, 2019
- Awarded International Women's Day He For She Award by Indian Council of UN Relations & Government of Delhi
- Mahatma Puraskar, 2021 for Social Impact as the WASH project reached to over 2.5 million women
