= Humans For Humanity =

Non-governmental organization

- Humans For Humanity's Logo
- Formation: 2014
- Founder: Anurag Chauhan
- Founded at: Dehradun, India
- Headquarters: Dehradun, India
- Region served: India
- Volunteers: 1500 (2019)
- Website: humansforhumanity.online

Humans For Humanity (HFH) is a non-governmental organization, founded by renowned social worker Anurag Chauhan, headquartered in Dehradun, India. It is working to bring awareness about menstrual health, hygiene among women across India. It is providing health, hygiene and comfort to women, especially in poverty-stricken and rural areas in India. The organization empowers women by educating women and young girls on menstruation and menstrual hygiene, and by conducting workshops to produce low-cost sanitary pads. The WASH project started by Humans For Humanity has reached over 3 million women in over 6 states in India in the last 6 years, as of October 2020.

It was founded in 2014 by Anurag Chauhan. For his work with Humans For Humanity, Chauhan honored with the International Women Empowerment Award by the Ministry of Women and Child Development, Ministry of Drinking Water and Sanitation, Government of India and UNICEF in 2019. During the pandemic the organisation has been providing aid & essentials to over 8000 families in various parts of the country, supporting communities, low income group families, trans men, widows, maids, etc. The NGO has started an employment generation programs to uplift and empower communities, making them financially stable & independent even during the pandemic. The WASH project which is a pilot project of the organisation has been working to promote menstrual hygiene among the women of rural areas of six states of the country including Uttarakhand, Delhi, Rajasthan, Haryana and others, decided to work on the initiative for trans men since last year.

== History ==
It was founded in 2014 by social activist Anurag Chauhan.

== Initiatives ==
=== WASH ===
The NGO runs a project WASH – Women, Sanitation, Hygiene, which educates rural women about Menstrual hygiene and provides training to them for making bio-degradable Sanitary napkin. It is an initiative to bring awareness among menstruating women. The initiative received support from Bollywood actress Twinkle Khanna. The project is being run in many villages, slums, government schools and colleges across India. It organized hundreds of such workshops and reached out to over 3 million women in India.

It trains women to make bio-degradable sanitary pads at an affordable cost. The women-centric workshop is headed by experienced doctors to make women aware of the biological reasons behind menstruation, stages from teenage to menopause, and several hormonal changes. In the community, counseling is provided to women in need who are dealing with menopause. With a separate team of nutritionists, the workshop provides information related to importance of a healthy diet and food. Affordability and quality are the two big concerns in sanitary napkins. Therefore, the organization trains women on how to make good sanitary napkins at their homes. It also covers the adverse effects of poor menstrual hygiene and spreads awareness about the proper disposal of napkins in the waste bin.

=== Stree-The Woman ===
In May 2016, Humans For Humanity launched an initiative called 'Stree-The Woman'. It is a one-day event that focuses on self-growth, self-empowerment and self-love. In 2019, the event was organized by the NGO, in association with Sipping Thoughts and BW Businessworld, which was attended by personalities like Rita Bahuguna Joshi, Liza Verma, Dr. Varun Katyal, Ambika Pillai, Malini Ramani and Sandip Soparrkar.

=== Breaking the Bloody Taboo ===
In the year 2018, the organization started a new campaign named 'Breaking the Bloody Taboo.' The main aim of this campaign is to stop the old-age taboo against women. In one of the campaigns in Rajasthan, the team members of Humans For Humanity organized a session with young girls and women of menstruating age. In another session, the founder of Humans for Humanity, Anurag Chauhan talked about the importance of holy plant Tulsi and handed over a few leaves to women and asked them to nurture the sampling and observe the results after a month.

=== COVID-19 pandemic ===
During the difficult times of nationwide lockdown in India, Human for Humanity came forward to help women and train them to make hygienic sanitary napkins at home safely. Under the WASH project by Humans for Humanity, the NGO is actively worked in six different states across India to serve and employ women from villages. The initiative has made hundreds of women financially independent and empowered.

During the lockdown in 2020, the workshop fed more than 1200 families in and around the slums of Delhi for six months. Humans For Humanity set up a transit camp and served people in the Kathputli Colony in the Anand Parbat area. Amid the COVID-19 pandemic and lockdown, schools have adapted themselves to online teaching. During these times, Humans for Humanity took the initiative to organize an online traditional puppetry program to give children interactive learning. The aim was to innovate the online learning methods and revive the centuries-old traditional art form. As soon as the lockdown was lifted in Delhi, the NGO started an employment program for street artists. Under the program, the community introduced artists to several schools and helped them generate income through various performances and online events.

=== Red Cloth Campaign ===
In 2020, Humans For Humanity launched 'Red Cloth Campaign' during the COVID-19 pandemic, to spread awareness about menstruation and bust the taboos. Actor Lisa Ray and singer Shibani Dandekar, Kirti Kulhari, Kubra Sait, Divya Seth supported the campaign along with thousands of social media users.

In April 2022, the WASH project was launched in Telangana by Humans For Humanity and has successfully conducted menstrual hygiene management & health workshops in many villages such as Challur village, Pochampalli village, Ghanmukla village, Reddipalli village, Keshavpatnam and many more.

== Other works ==
In September 2019, Humans for Humanity hosted an event called 'The Conversation Fest', in association with Sipping Thoughts, where Karan Johar interviewed Ma Anand Sheela, former spokesperson of Rajneesh movement.

In December 2019, the NGO organized a talk, BW Dialogue in association with BusinessWorld and Sipping Thoughts, where Ma Anand Sheela, candidly recounted her feelings for Bhagwan Shree Rajneesh.

== Award and recognition ==
Year	Award	Awarding organisation
2019	International Women Empowerment Award	IWES, Ministry of Women and Child Development, Ministry of Drinking Water and Sanitation, Government of India and UNICEF
2019	International Women's Day He For She Award	Indian Council of UN Relations & Government of Delhi
