= Moozhikkal Pankajakshi =

Indian puppeteer (1936–2026)

- Born: 14 March 1936; Urulikunnath, Pala, Travancore, India
- Died: 15 July 2026 (aged 90); Kottayam, Kerala, India
- Known for: Nokkuvidya pavakali puppetry
- Spouse: Shivarama Panicker
- Children: 3
- Awards: Padma Shri

Moozhikkal Pankajakshi (14 March 1936 – 15 July 2026) was an Indian expert in Nokkuvidya pavakali, a form of puppetry. She was awarded her country's fourth highest civilian award, the Padma Shri, in 2020.

== Life and career ==
Pankajakshi Moozhikkal Sivaraman, popularly known as Moozhikkal Pankajakshi Amma, was born on 14 March 1936, at Urulikunnath, Pala, Kottayam district. She dropped out of school midway due to financial difficulties. Pankajakshiamma started learning Nokkuvidya from her mother Paappiyamma. She who learned Nokkuvidya at the age of eleven, later used to perform it with songs written by her husband after her marriage. A Nokkuvidya Pavakali performer for over 60 years, due to old age, vision loss and memory loss, she stopped performing Nokkuvidya at the age of 72. After that she taught the folk art form to her granddaughter Renjini.

=== Personal life and death ===
Pankajakshi Amma married Shivarama Panicker of Monippally near Uzhavoor, Kottayam district, at the age of 20. The couple had three children, Vijayan, Radhamani and Shiva. She lived in Monippally with her daughter Radhamani.

Pankajakshi died at a private hospital in Koothattukulam, Kerala, on 15 July 2026, after a prolonged illness related to old age. She was 90.

== Awards and honours ==
Pankajakshi received several awards including Padma Shri (2020), India's fourth highest civilian honour and fellowship from Kerala Folklore Academy (2012). In 2008, as part of the Kerala Tourism Festival, she performed at Paris. Apart from this Pankajakshi Amma had performed Nokuvidya in many venues in Kerala and outside Kerala.

== Works on her ==
Reshmi Radhakrishnan's documentary film Nokkuvidya, The life of a lone string puppeteer, screened at the International Documentary and Short Film Festival of Kerala, is about Nokkuvidya and its performer Pankajakshi.
