= Shadipur Depot =

- Neighborhood of Delhi
- Location in Delhi, India
- Coordinates: 28.653°N 77.1557°E
- Country: India
- State: Delhi
- District: West Delhi

Languages
  - Official: Hindi
- Time zone: UTC+5:30 (IST)

Shadipur Depot is a residential and industrial area in West Delhi, named after nearby Shadipur settlement. This is also a depot for the Delhi Transport Corporation (DTC). It is also known for the 'Baljit Nagar', where in Kathputli Colony, puppeteers, magicians, acrobats, dancers and musicians, and other itinerant performance groups have settled for half a century.

Its neighbouring areas are Mayapuri and Naraina.

== Transport ==
The area is serviced by Shadipur Station of Delhi Metro Shadipur Station. Close to it lies a critical intersection, where the average number of vehicles on a typical summer evening passing through the intersection per green signal is 280. The number of cars and buses that populate that stretch of the movement is about 148. The sign of the previous intersection is also usually synchronized with this one.
