= Kathputli Colony =

Coordinates: 28.655°N 77.152°E

- Neighborhood of Delhi
- Location in Delhi, India
- Country: India
- State: Delhi

Languages
  - Official: Hindi
- Time zone: UTC+5:30 (IST)

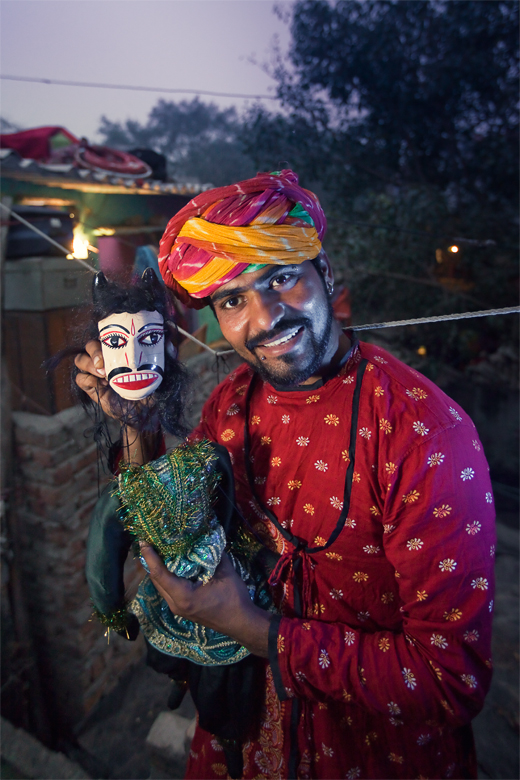
Puppeteer of Kathputli Colony

Kathputli Colony is a colony of street performers in Shadipur Depot area of Delhi. For the last 50 years, it is home to some 2,800 families of magicians, snake charmers, acrobats, singers, dancers, actors, traditional healers and musicians and especially puppeteers or kathputli-performers from Rajasthan. This makes it world’s largest community of street performers.

The colony is undergoing an in situ redevelopment plan by Delhi Development Authority (DDA) of Government of Delhi.

== Etymology ==
The name Kathputli Colony comes from Hindi language word for puppet, Kathputli.

== History ==
The colony started in the 1950s, as a cluster of makeshift tents in an open field on the outskirts of Delhi, set up by itinerant puppeteers from Rajasthan, which gave the colony its name. In the coming decades street performers of Andhra Pradesh and Maharashtra also moved in. The nature of their profession meant frequent traveling for performances and the need for public transport. The folk artists of Kathputli Colony have traveled to over 80 countries representing India with their art forms. Today, it is prime real estate area surrounded by Mayapuri and Naraina.

== Redevelopment plan ==
In 2010, Government of Delhi initiated the redevelopment project of the colony on a public-private partnership basis. The contract was granted to Raheja Developers. As per the plan, 2800 flats will be built in 10-story buildings on the 5.2 hectares, apart from that a portion of the land will be given to the developer to construct its own commercial and residential buildings.

Amid protests by residents and controversy, in early 2014, ahead of the 1 April 2014 deadline, some of the 2,754 families started shifting to transit camps built at Anand Parbat area 2 km away by the developer Rahejas. They are expected to stay here for the next two years, while the site undergoes construction.

== Bibliography ==
- "The Case of Kathputli Colony: Mapping Delhi's First In-situ Slum Rehabilitation Project" (PDF). Centre for Policy Research.
