= Nang talung =

Shadow puppetry from Thailand

Nang talung หนังตะลุง
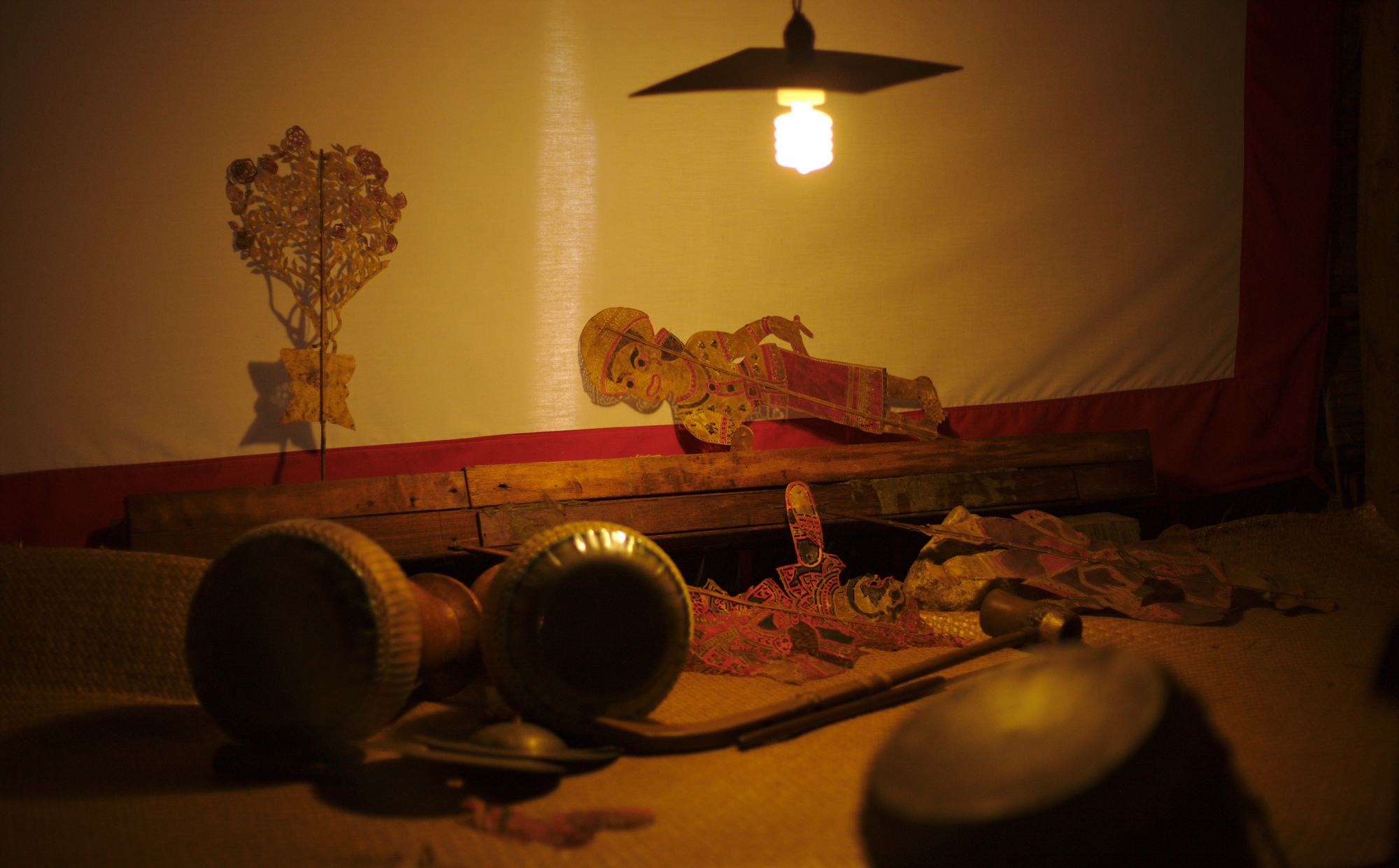
- A traditional Nang talung shadow puppetry stage
- Medium: Shadow play
- Types: Thai shadow puppetry, closely related to Nang yai
- Ancestor arts: Siamese
- Originating culture: Thailand
- Originating era: Hindu—Buddhist civilisations

Nang talung (Thai: หนังตะลุง, pronounced [nǎŋ tā.lūŋ]) is a traditional form of shadow puppetry originally from Southern Thailand, made of painted buffalo hide or cowhide. The shadow play also resemble the shadow plays of Thailand (Nang yai), Malaysia, and Indonesia (Wayang and Wayang kulit). In a Nang talung performance, the puppet figures are rear-projected on a taut linen screen with a coconut oil (or electric) light. The skilled puppeteer manipulates carved leather figures between the lamp and the screen to bring the shadows to life. Nang yai features life-size puppets, while nang talung puppets are much smaller, which usually occur at domestic rituals and ceremonies or at commercial and temple fairs

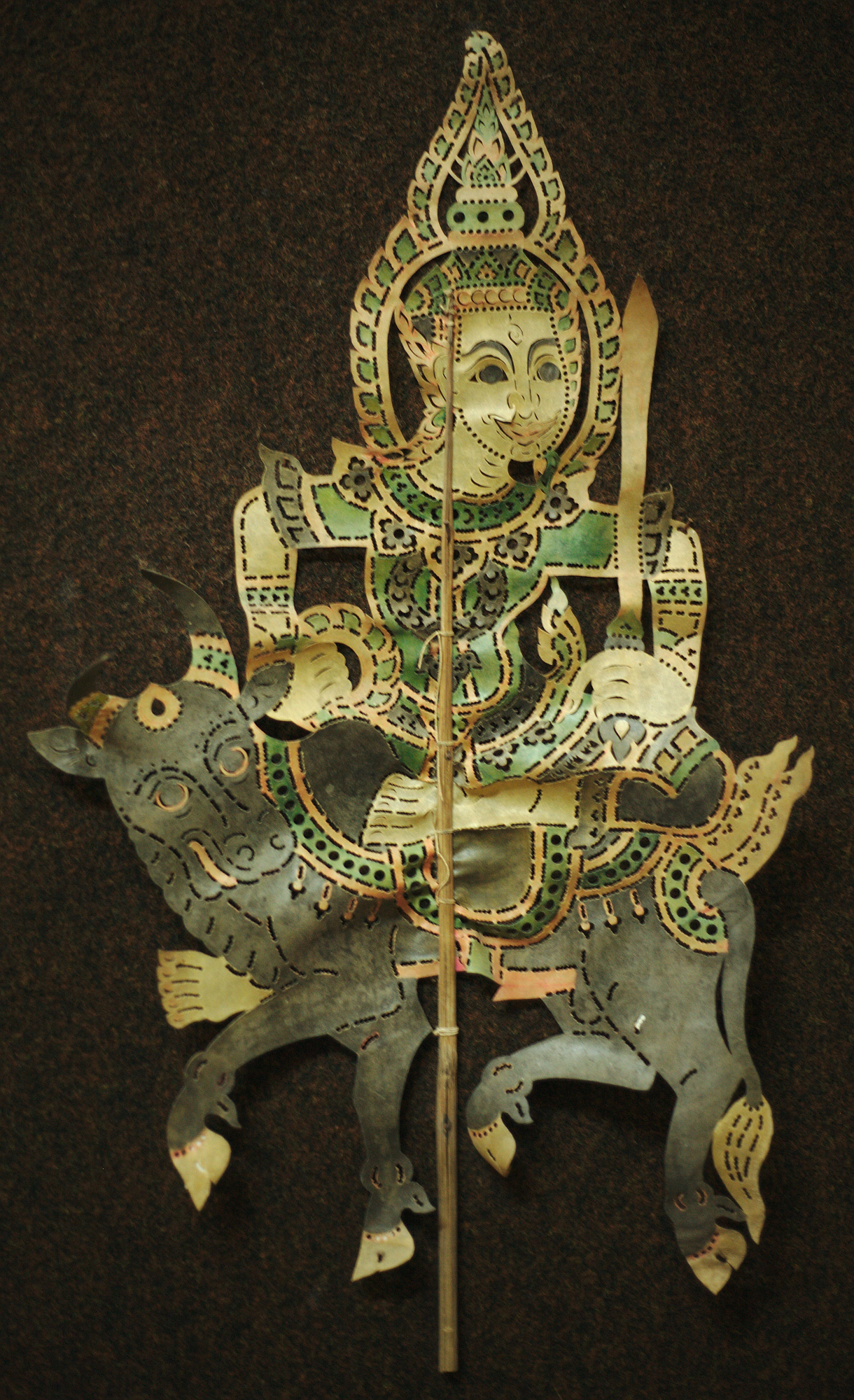
A Thai nang talung shadow puppet

Southern Thailand's puppets are made of leather and are typically between 15 and 50 centimeters in size. The performance consists of the puppets, the narrator, the actor, and the musician. The actor and the audience are separated by a white screen during the show.

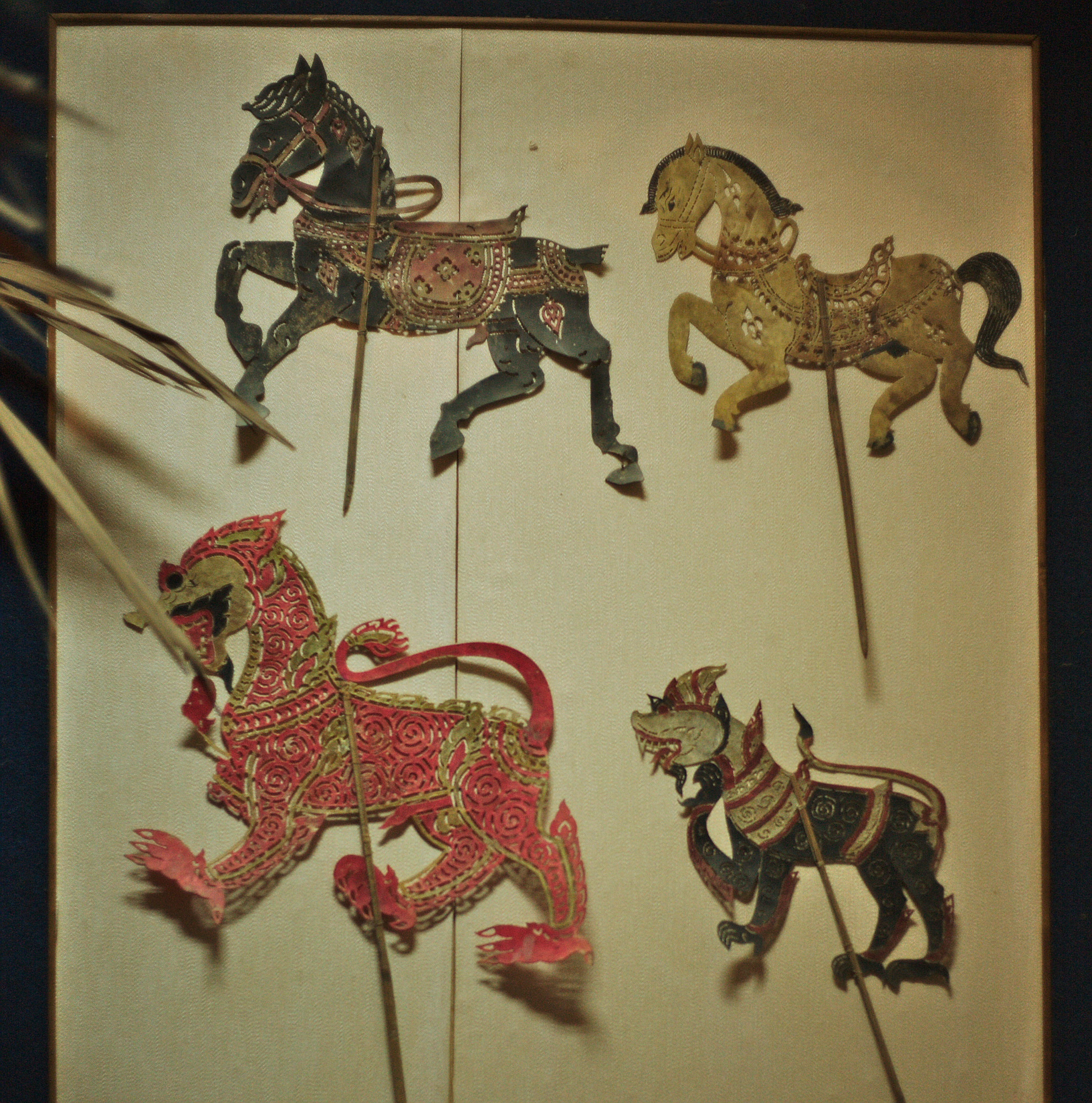
Animal shadow puppets in the nang talung tradition

Nang talung has been extremely popular for a long time. On the other hand, the art form is slowly disappearing because it is complicated. There is a campaign to preserve the traditions of nang talung for future generations.

In Malaysia, wayang kulit gedek has its origin from Nang Talung and is traditionally performed in Kedah. While wayang kulit Kelantan or wayang Siam is believed to have originated from Thailand and is traditionally performed in Kelantan. Both forms exhibit Thai influence in their figures, performance styles and music.

== Etymology ==
The term Nang (Thai: หนัง) means "leather" ("leather puppet" in this case), and talung (Thai: ตะลุง) is an abbreviation of Phattalung, a southern city where the shadow play tradition has long been popular.

== Comic characters ==
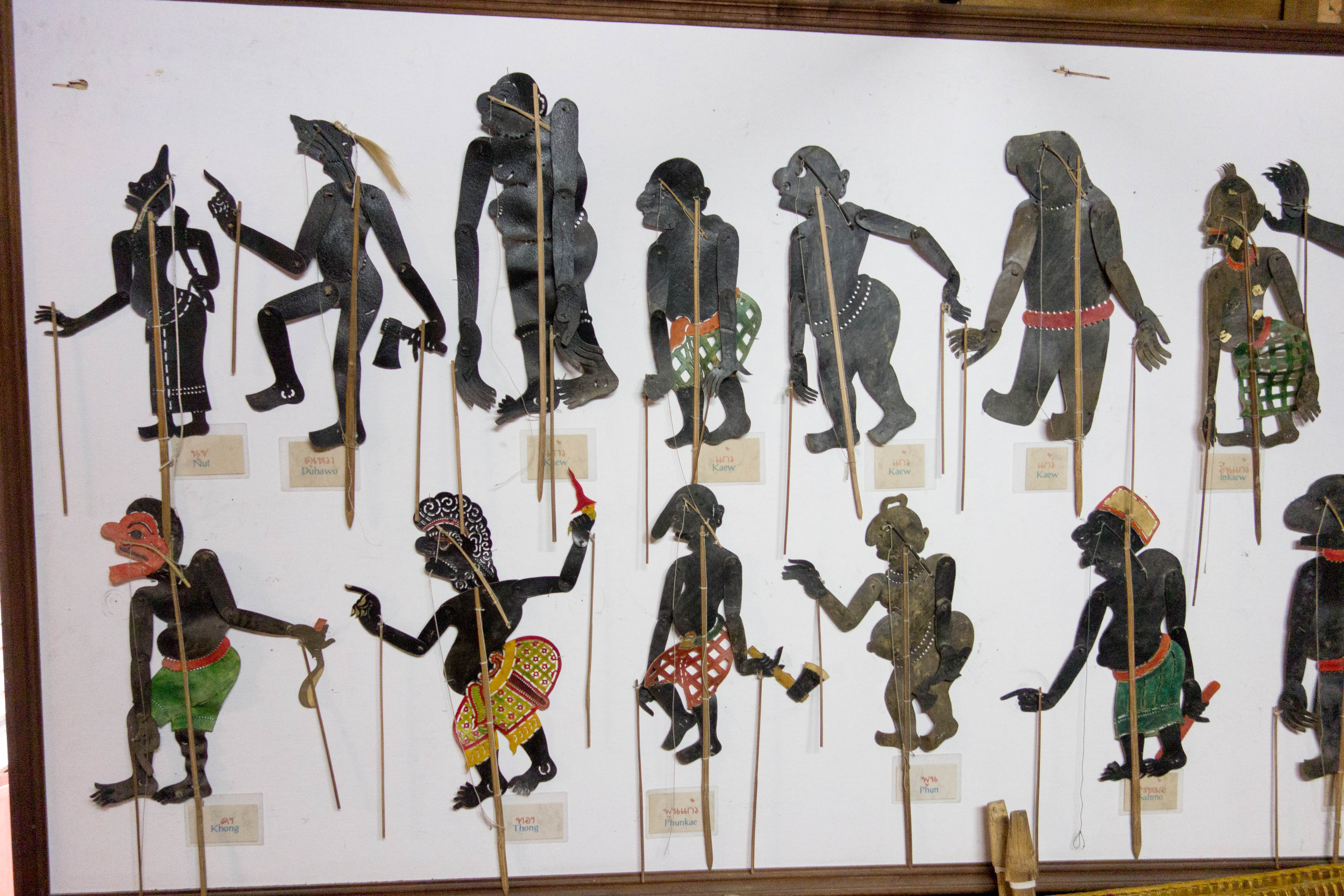
A collection of Nang Talung comic characters

Comic characters in Nang Talung are known as rup kak (Thai: รูปกาก). They are generally depicted without shirts, with some wearing short sarongs and others wearing trousers and chong kraben. Most carry a characteristic weapon, and the puppets have movable hands and mouths. A Nang Talung troupe usually has at least ten comic figures, although no more than six are normally used in a single story.

=== Theng (Thai: เท่ง) ===
Theng is based on a man from Ban Khu Kut, Sathing Phra, Songkhla Province. The puppet was first created by the Chuan troupe (Thai: หนังจวน), and was later adopted by other Nang Talung troupes. He is depicted as a tall, thin, dark-skinned man with a relatively long upper body, a receding forehead, curly hair, and a wide mouth. He wears a checked sarong, a pha khao ma around his waist, and no shirt. His characteristic weapon is an ai khrok knife (Thai: มีดอ้ายครก).

Theng is outspoken, aggressive in speech, and fond of teasing and threatening others. He is usually paired with Noo Nui.

=== Noo Nui (Thai: หนูนุ้ย) ===
Noo Nui is based on the image of a simple-minded and somewhat foolish man. He is depicted as a short, dark-skinned man with a large, sagging belly, a drooping neck, protruding nose and mouth, and a long beard resembling a goat's beard. He wears a plain sarong and no shirt and carries a betel nut cutter as his weapon).

Noo Nui speaks in a low, trembling voice and is easily influenced by others. His character is generally portrayed as simple and gullible and becomes upset when others talk about cows. He is commonly paired with Theng.

=== Yot Thong (Thai: ยอดทอง) ===
Yot Thong is traditionally believed to have been based on a real person from Phatthalung Province. He is depicted as a fat, dark-skinned man with a large belly, curly hair, a prominent nose, and a sunken mouth resembling that of an elderly toothless man. His face is marked with scars and is sometimes compared to that of a crocodile. He wears a patterned chong kraben and carries a kris.

Yot Thong is portrayed as boastful, flirtatious, cowardly, and easily flattered. He frequently exaggerates his own qualities and attempts to frighten others despite his timid nature. He can appear alongside several other comic characters, including Si Kaew, Kwan Mueang, Phun Kaew, Dam Ba, Kaew Kop, and Samian.

=== Si Kaew (Thai: สีแก้ว) ===
Si Kaew is based on a man from Ban Ratpoon, Krasae Sin, Songkla Province. He is depicted as a short, stocky, dark-skinned man with a prominent neck, a bald head, and a checked chong kraben. He does not carry a weapon.

Unlike many other comic characters, Si Kaew is portrayed as straightforward and serious. He is willing to confront others and is known for speaking honestly and acting according to his words. He may also advise other characters to behave properly. He becomes angry when others make jokes about monks, heat, or money. His speech is slow and deliberate. His usual companion is Yot Thong.

=== Samo (Thai: สะหม้อ) ===
Samo was based on a real Muslim man named Samo from Ban Sakom, Chana, Songkhla Province, with his permission. The character was later adopted by other Nang Talung troupes. He is depicted as a short man with a hunched back, a prominent neck, a hanging chin, and a protruding belly. He wears a taqiyah or a songkok and a sarong and does not wear a shirt.

Samo is known for his slow speech and his ability to imitate and tease other characters. He is also portrayed as somewhat boastful and mischievous. His character reflects the presence of Muslim communities and local cultural interaction in southern Thailand.

=== Khwan Mueang (Thai: ขวัญเมือง) ===
Khwan Mueang has no known recorded origin as a character. He is a principal comic character of the Chan Kaew Nang Talung troupe (Thai: หนังจันทร์แก้ว) in Nakhon Si Thammarat Province and is locally known as "Uncle Khwan Mueang" (Thai: ลุงขวัญเมือง), a form of address suggesting his high standing among local audiences.

He is depicted with a goat-like face, sparse slightly curly hair, dark skin, a receding forehead, a large elongated nose, a wide mouth, and a sagging belly. He wears plain black cloth and a belt and does not wear a shirt. His character is generally simple and curious, although he may sometimes display unexpected cleverness. He speaks in a gentle voice.

Khwan Mueang is paired with Samo in some Songkhla performances and with Yot Thong in parts of Nakhon Si Thammarat. In Nang Talung traditions in Phatthalung and Trang, he may also serve as a messenger or town gatekeeper who announces events by beating a gong.

=== Phu Yai Phun (Thai: ผู้ใหญ่พูน) ===
Phu Yai Phun is thought to have been modelled on a village headman. He is depicted as a tall, large man with a long, hook-shaped nose, a bald head with a rectangular tuft of hair, a large sagging belly, and broad raised hips. He wears a plain chong kraben and generally carries no distinctive weapon.

Phu Yai Phun is boastful, status-conscious, and fond of provoking or intimidating others. Despite his outwardly threatening manner, he is portrayed as cowardly and often attempts to protect himself by exaggerating events or reporting them to his superiors. He commonly appears as a servant of the giants or of antagonistic characters. His speech is slow and nasal.

=== Tho (Thai: โถ) ===
Tho is based on a Peranakan Chinese from Phang Bua, Sathing Phra, Songkhla Province. He is depicted with a relatively small head, large protruding eyes, a wide mouth, a prominent abdomen, and a large curved chest. He wears a hat with a tuft on top, trousers, and carries a cleaver.

Tho enjoys singing and dancing but is portrayed as timid and easily frightened. He rarely becomes angry and is particularly preoccupied with food. Whatever the subject of a conversation, he tends to turn it towards eating.

=== Kaew Kop (Thai: แก้วกบ) ===
Kaew Kop, also known as Luk Mi (Thai: ลูกหมี), is a principal comic character in Nang Talung from Nakhon Si Thammarat. He is depicted as a fat man with a wide mouth resembling that of a frog.

Kaew Kop is cheerful and enjoys entertaining others. His speech is often unclear, and he is known for misusing words or using incorrect expressions. e also enjoys reciting comic verse, although his verses may lack conventional rhyme. His usual companion is Yot Thong.

== See also ==
- Culture of Thailand
- Hun krabok, Thai equivalent
- Hun lakhon lek, Thai equivalent
- Karagöz and Hacivat, Turkish equivalent
- Menora, Southern Thai theatrical performance
- Nang yai, Thai equivalent
- Tholu bommalata, Indian equivalent
- Wayang, Indonesian and Malay equivalent
- Wayang kulit, Indonesian equivalent
