= Nang yai =

Thai shadow play

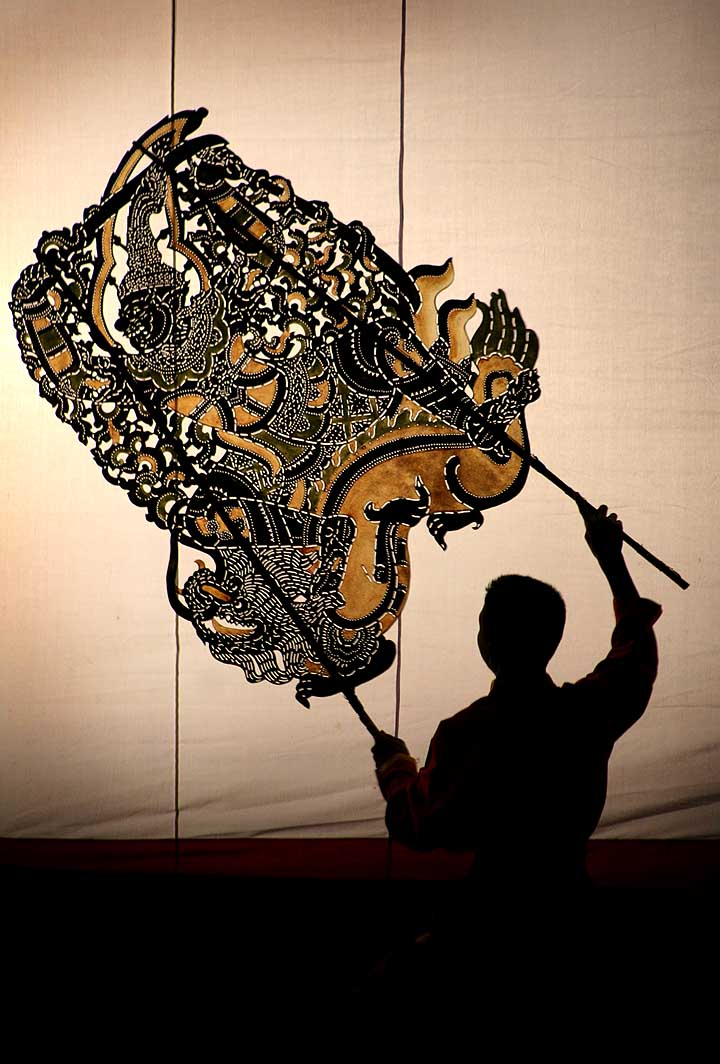
A nang drama player and puppet

Nang yai (Thai: หนังใหญ่, pronounced [nǎŋ jàj]) is a form of shadow play found in Thailand. Puppets are made of painted buffalo hide, while the story is narrated by songs, chants and music.

Nang means "leather" ("leather puppet" in this case), and in common usage refers to a dance-drama shadow puppet show. Nang yai, whose name specifically means "large shadow puppet", features life-size puppets, while nang talung (a similar tradition of shadow puppetry whose name derives from Phattalung, a southern city where the tradition has long been popular) features much smaller puppets. Both are particularly popular in southern Thailand. According to James Brandon, most scholars believe that nang yai came to Thailand via Java and the Malay Peninsula from India.

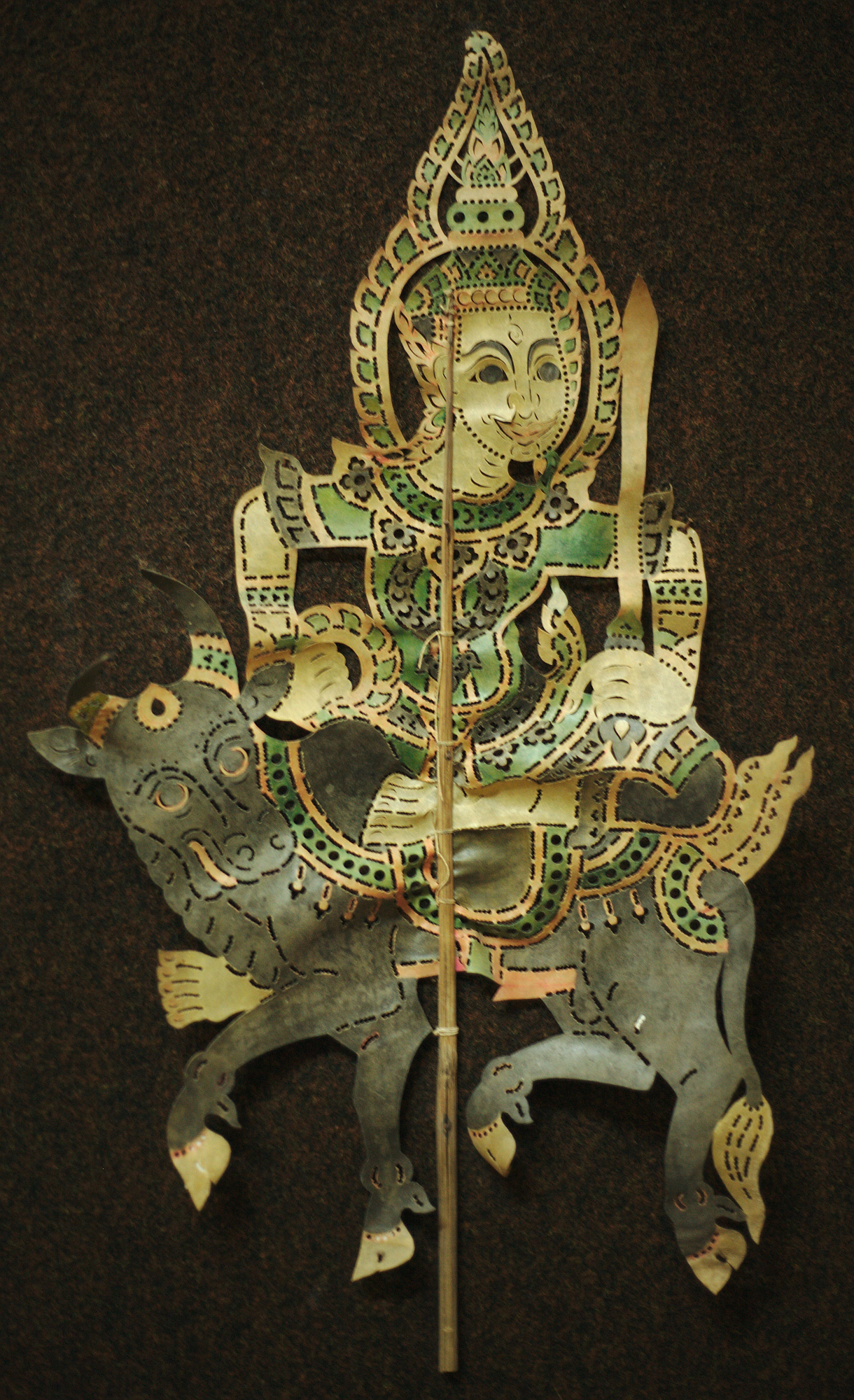
Thailand shadow puppet

Nang yai and nang talung incorporate various episodes of the Thai epic Ramakien (based on "Ramayana" from India). The art form's traditions originated around the beginning of the 15th century. Nang yai performances were a popular means of entertainment during the Ayutthaya period and are mentioned in a poem called "Bunnovat Khamchan", written by the Buddhist monk Mahanag sometime around the years 1751 to 1758, at the end of King Boromakot's reign. The earliest known mention of nang yai in Thai records is from 1458, according to Brandon.

Performances are traditionally held in open spaces such as a lawn or village dirt space. A white cloth screen about 16 metres (52 ft) long and 6 metres (20 ft) high, with a decorated border, is stretched across the stage. Behind the screen, a bonfire is lit to project the puppets' shadows (electric lights are often used instead now). During the show, a Thai instrumental ensemble (usually a piphat) plays music appropriate to each episode, synchronized with the puppets' action. Offstage reciters tell the story in a sort of heightened speech. The puppet figures are made from perforated cow or buffalo hide, each weighing about three or four kilograms. The biggest puppet is one which characterizes a place, weighing around five to seven kilograms.

Nang yai influenced that khon, a dance-drama art form from Thailand which involves masked pantomime.

Nang yai can be found throughout Thailand. For example, in central Thailand, nang yai is performed at Wat Khanon in Ratchaburi, Wat Plub in Petchaburi, Wat Sawang Arom in Singburi, and Wat Pumarin in Samut Songkhram, while in eastern Thailand it can be found at Wat Donin in Rayong Province.

== See also ==
- Nang talung, Thai equivalent
- Hun lakhon lek, Thai equivalent
- Wayang, Indonesian and Malay equivalent
- Tholu bommalata, indian equivalent
- Karagöz and Hacivat, Turkish equivalent
