= Hun lakhon lek =

Type of traditional Thai puppet

Hun lakhon lek (Thai: หุ่นละครเล็ก, pronounced [hùn lā.kʰɔ̄ːn lék]) is a type of traditional small Thai puppet which uses three puppeteers working together to produce a character with more mobility and lifelike movement.

== History ==
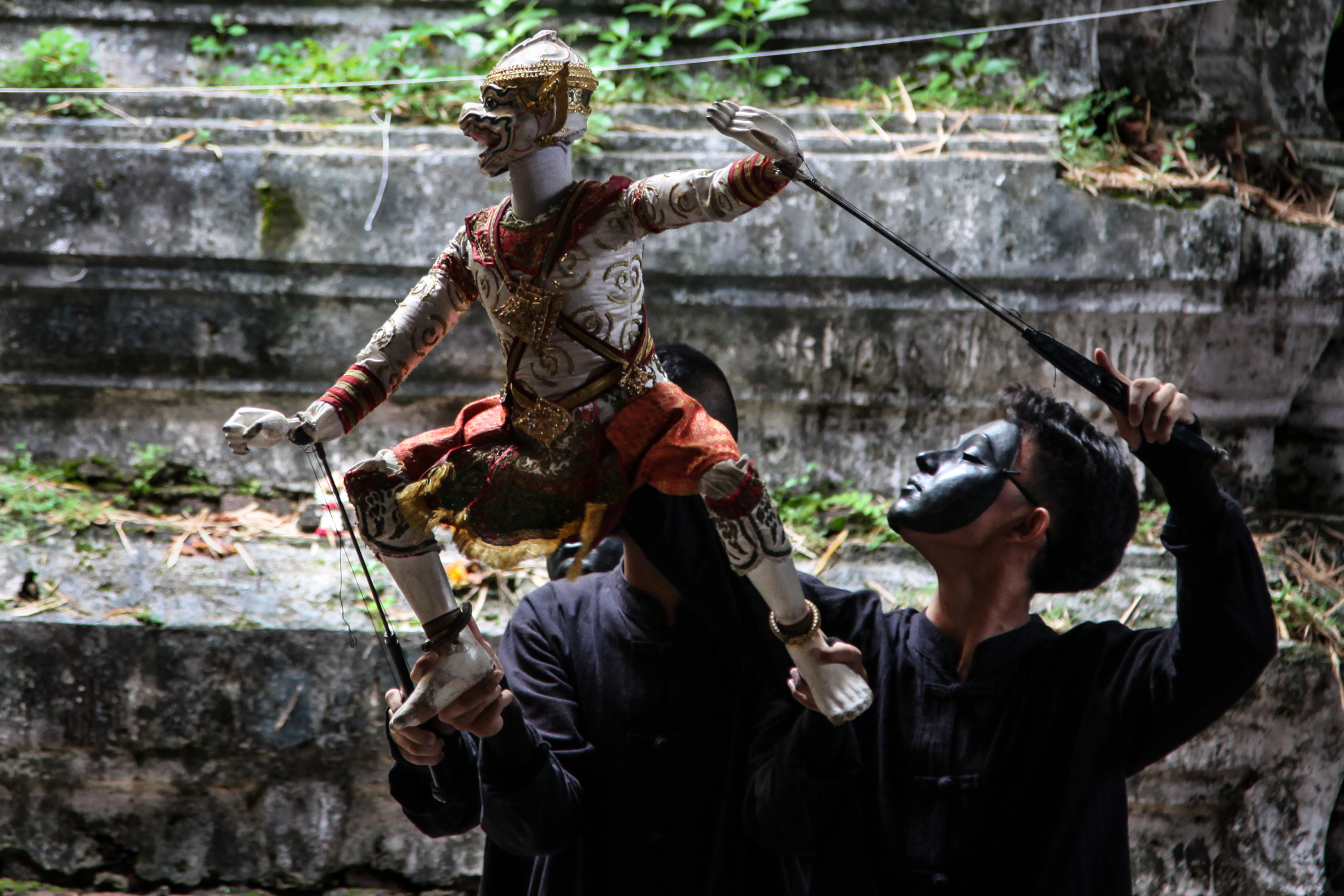
hun lakhon lek (Thai puppet play)

Hun la korn lek has been a form of entertainment for the Thai people and foreigners alike for more than a century. It was invented by Kru Krae Suppawanich in 1901 during the reign of King Mongkut (King Rama IV). He developed it while trying to construct a Hun Laung (Royal Thai puppet), which he found involved too many complicated structures and too many strings. He decreased the number of the strings inside the puppet, and thus invented hun la korn lek. His first performance was in Varadis Palace.

Kru Kare continued performing with his puppets, but after World War II he found he was growing older, and that hun la korn lek was beginning to decrease in popularity. He passed 30 of his puppets onto his daughter-in-law, and the rest of his puppets were "drowned" in the Chao Phraya River. Later on, his daughter-in-law passed the remaining puppets on to Sakorn Yang-keawsot (English nickname Joe Louis) because of his ability in performing with the puppets. Hun la korn lek was brought back to the public eye by the ministry of culture at the celebration of the 200th anniversary of Bangkok in 1985, and has been publicly performed continuously ever since.

== Construction of the puppets ==
All the structures and head are molded from clay to generate a character with a human-like appearance. These clay pieces are covered with paper and allowed to dry in the sun. Arms and legs are made from fabric which is filled with cotton. Wooden foldable joints are attached so limbs have a lifelike movement. Hands and feet are carved from Thong Lang wood, a wood which is lightweight and carves easily. The pieces are painted. Costumes are made using handmade cloth and sewed by hand according to traditional Thai sewing methods. The face of the puppet is painted with colored clay to match the color of human skin. Eyes and lips are painted with poster paint.

== Performance technique ==
To perform Hun la korn lek, three puppeteers are responsible for different functions. They need to have a thorough knowledge of basic Khon dancing and teamwork to perform together as one coordinated character. The first puppeteer controls the head and the right hand of the puppet. The second puppeteer controls the left hand of the puppet. The third puppeteer controls the feet of the puppet.

== Story ==
Hun la korn lek performances generally involve renditions of Thai Royal novels and traditional Thai novels, mainly Ramakein and Sang Thong. The play does not generally involve a performance of the whole story from beginning to end, but only one chosen part of the story which is divided into three acts. The story may be told in its original version or rearranged by the composer.

== See also ==
- Hun krabok
- Nang yai
- Nang talung
