= Samar (name) =

Samar समर
- Gender: male/female

Origin
- Origin: Sanskrit, Arabic
- Meaning: "Reward", "Fruit", "Battlefield Commander", "Evening conversations", "War"

Other names
- Related names: Samer, Samra

Samar is a female/male given name, gender is based on the country. It is used in several languages.

== Sanskrit ==
Samar in Sanskrit, the word originates from an ancient manuscript, Samarangana Sutradhara, or "Battlefield Commander" (sometimes abbreviated "the Samar"), detailing techniques of warfare and ancient Hindu aeronautics, composed in Sanskrit by King Bhoja of Dhar of the Paramara Dynasty in the 11th Century A.D. It is also referred as time in folk phrases.

== Arabic ==
Samar is generally an Arabic female given name meaning "evening conversations (including Arabic music and poetry)". Samar is a female name in Arabic and Islamic culture.

Another meaning used as a female given name bears the meaning "the night and its blackness", where the saying goes: "lā âtiy-hi samara (لا آتيهِ سَمَرًا)", meaning "I wouldn't visit him at samar (that is, the night)" or another meaning used as the "brown" like the shadow of the Moon.

The name or adjective itself stems from the root verb samara (سَمَرَ) meaning "chat with one another at the night, having an evening of entertainment".

Another possibility Arabs where the name is used stems from the root verb Samra (سمرأ) meaning "to have a dark complexion - brown, embrown, tan" or "to make something brown - browning, brownish". Also, the name is from the brown colour that is the shadow of the Moon.

Samar in Arabic is a cognate of the Hebrew name Shamar, which means "preservation, protection, conservation".

This name is the stem or root of other Arabic given names associated with this name, the variants are:

- Samer (سَامِر sāmir) - male given name
- Samir (سَمِير samīr) - male given name
- Samira (سَمِيرة samīrah) - female given name formed from the male given name Samir (سَمِير samīr)

== Hindi ==
Samar is a Hindi male given name and means "war" from the Sanskrit Samara.

== People with the surname Samar (Sanskrit/ Hindi) ==
- Akim Samar (1916 - 1943), Soviet Nanai poet
- Devi Lal Samar, founder-director of the Bharatiya Lok Kala Mandal folk-theatre museum

== People with the given name Samar (Sanskrit/ Hindi) ==
- Samar Banerjee, Indian footballer, popularly known as Badru
- Samar Das, Bangladeshi musician and composer
- Samar Guha, Indian politician and Indian independence movement activist
- Samar Halarnkar, editor-at-large of Hindustan Times
- Samar Sen (1916–1987), Indian poet and fingerstyle singer-songwriter

== People with the given name and surname Samar (Arabic) ==
- Samar Abu Elouf (b. 1983 or 1984), Palestinian photojournalist
- Samar Andeel (b. 1987), a female singer from Egypt
- Samar Hazboun (b. 1985), Palestinian photographer
- Samar Kokash (b. 1972), Syrian actress and voice actress
- Samar Minallah, Pakistani human right activist
- Samar Mubarakmand (b. 1942), Pakistani nuclear physicist
- Sima Samar (b. 1957), Afghan human rights activist

== Places ==
- Samar, an island in the Philippine Archipelago
