= Shamar =

Shamar may refer to:

- Shammar, an Arab tribe
- Shamar, Iran
- Shamar (given name), given name to a boys or girls
