= Sammer =

Sammer is a surname. Notable people with the surname include:

- Klaus Sammer (born 1942), German soccer player and coach
- Markus Sammer (born 1988), Austrian bobsledder
- Matthias Sammer (born 1967), German soccer player and coach

== See also ==
- Samer (name)
- Sammes
