= Sammes =

Sammes is a surname. Notable people with the surname include:

- Aylett Sammes (1636?–1679?), English antiquary
- Mike Sammes (1928–2001), English musician and vocal session arranger
- William Sammes (politician), Mayor of Lincoln from 1515 to 1516
- William Sammes (judge), English judge from 1643 to 1646

== See also ==
- Sammer
