= Devi Lal Samar =

Indian puppeteer (1911–1981)

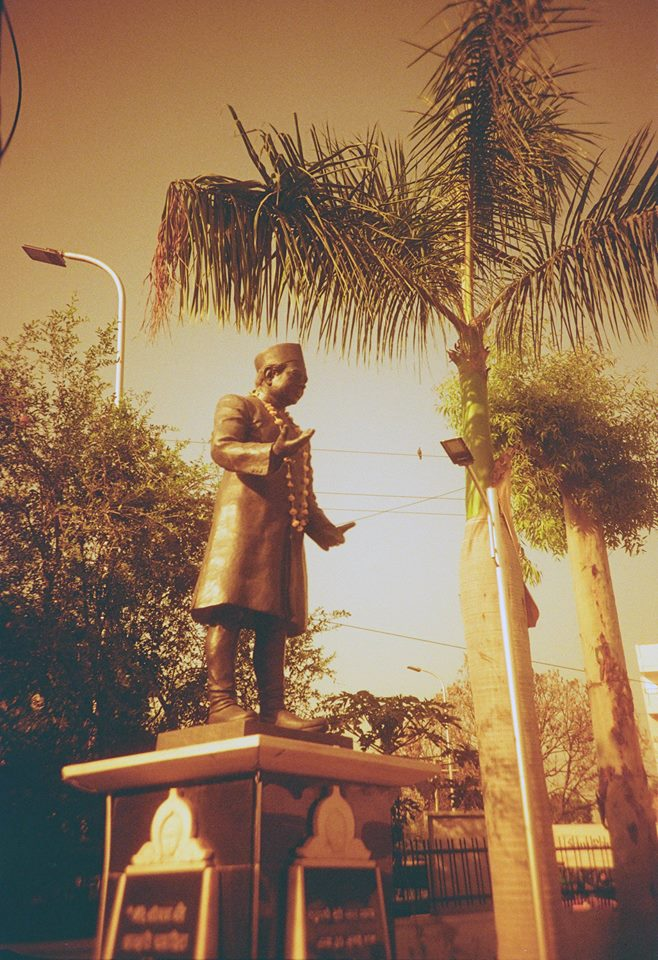
- Born: 30 July 1911
- Died: 3 December 1981 (aged 70)

Devi Lal Samar (30 July 1911 – 3 December 1981) was an Indian puppeteer who was the founder-director of a folk-theatre museum called the Bharatiya Lok Kala Mandal in Udaipur, Rajasthan. He was awarded Padma Shri for his outstanding work. He wrote several books in Hindi about Rajasthani theatre and puppetry.

Samar was a school teacher who learnt puppetry and in 1952 set up Bhartia Lok Kala Mandal. He also began the first puppet festival in 1954.

Devila Samar received the Padma Shri in 1968 for Katputli art. He died on 3 December 1981, at the age of 70.

== See also ==
- Devi Lal Samar the Visionary Behind The Bharatiya Lok Kala Mandal
- Kathputli (Puppet)

== Sources ==
- puppetindia
- ignca
- kalamandal
