= Samer (name) =

Samer (Arabic: سامر, pronounced [sɑːmer]) is an Arabic male name literally means "informal friendly talk or chat to pass the night", "one to whom you speak", "congregation of those who spend the evening in pleasant conversation", "evening chat companion", "entertainer, companion". The name Samar has the same origin.

The name or adjective itself stems from the root verb samara (سَمَرَ) meaning "chat with one another at the night, having an evening of entertainment".

Notable people with the name include:

- Samer Awad (born 1982), Syrian footballer
- Samer Tariq Issawi (born 1979), Palestinian activist
- Samer Majali, Jordanian businessman
- Samer Al Marta (born 1972), Kuwaiti association football player
- Samer El Masri, Australian-Lebanese rugby league player
- Samer al-Masry (born 1969), Syrian actor
- Samer Saeed (born 1987), Iraqi association football player
- Samer Salem (footballer, born 1992), Saudi footballer for Al-Najma
- Samer Salem (footballer, born 1993), Syrian footballer for Hutteen
- Samer Raimouny, Jordanian poet and activist
- Samer Libdeh, Jordanian-English journalist, researcher and policy analyst
