= Bharatiya Lok Kala Mandal =

Coordinates: 24.5944916°N 73.6894614°E

- Established: 1952
- Location: Udaipur, Rajasthan, India
- Type: Cultural institution, Museum
- Collections: Rural dresses, ornaments, puppets, masks, dolls, folk musical instruments, folk deities, paintings

Bharatiya Lok Kala Mandal is a museum based in Udaipur in Rajasthan state in India engaged in studying folk art, culture, songs and festivals of Rajasthan, Gujarat and Madhya Pradesh and to popularise and propagate folk arts, folk dances and folk literature. It was founded by Padam Shri Late Devi Lal Samar in the year 1952. The institution has a museum that exhibits collection of folk articles from Rajasthan like rural-dresses, ornaments, puppets, masks, dolls, folk musical instruments, folk deities and paintings. There is puppet theater (Kathputli) too where puppet shows are held at regular intervals.

== Museum ==
It includes a museum dedicated to folk art of Rajasthan.

Wall sculptures

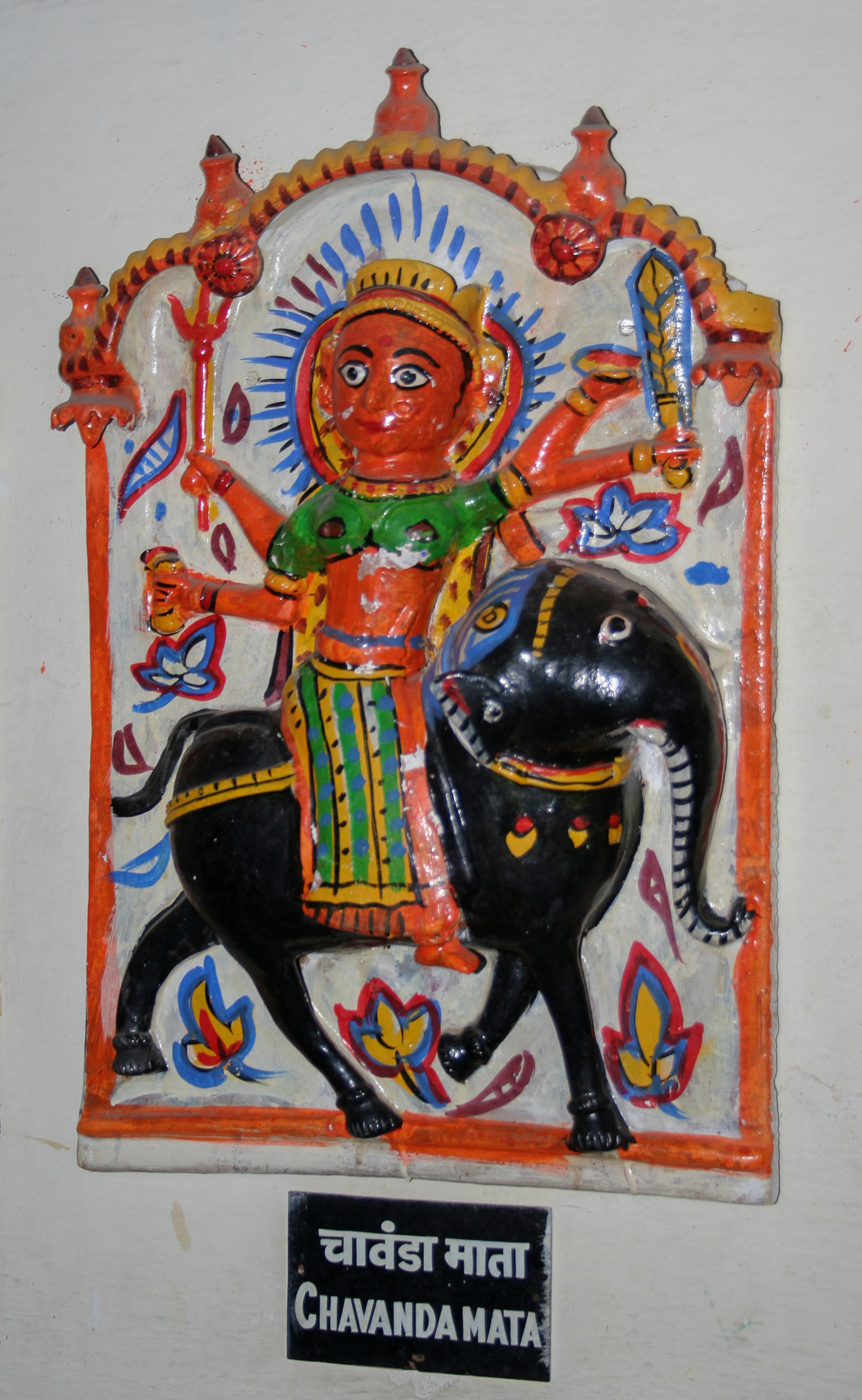
Chavanda Mata

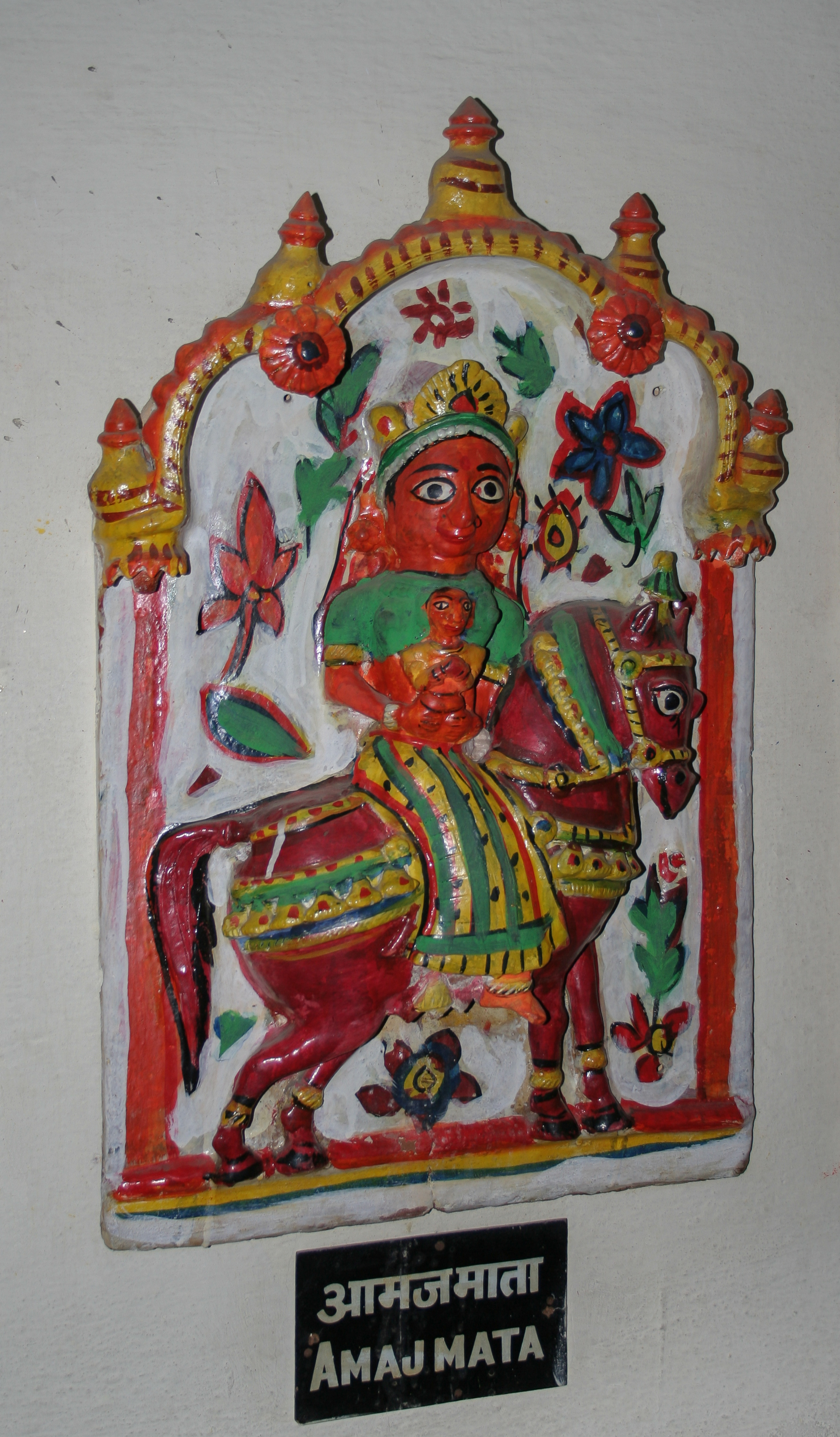
Amaj Mata

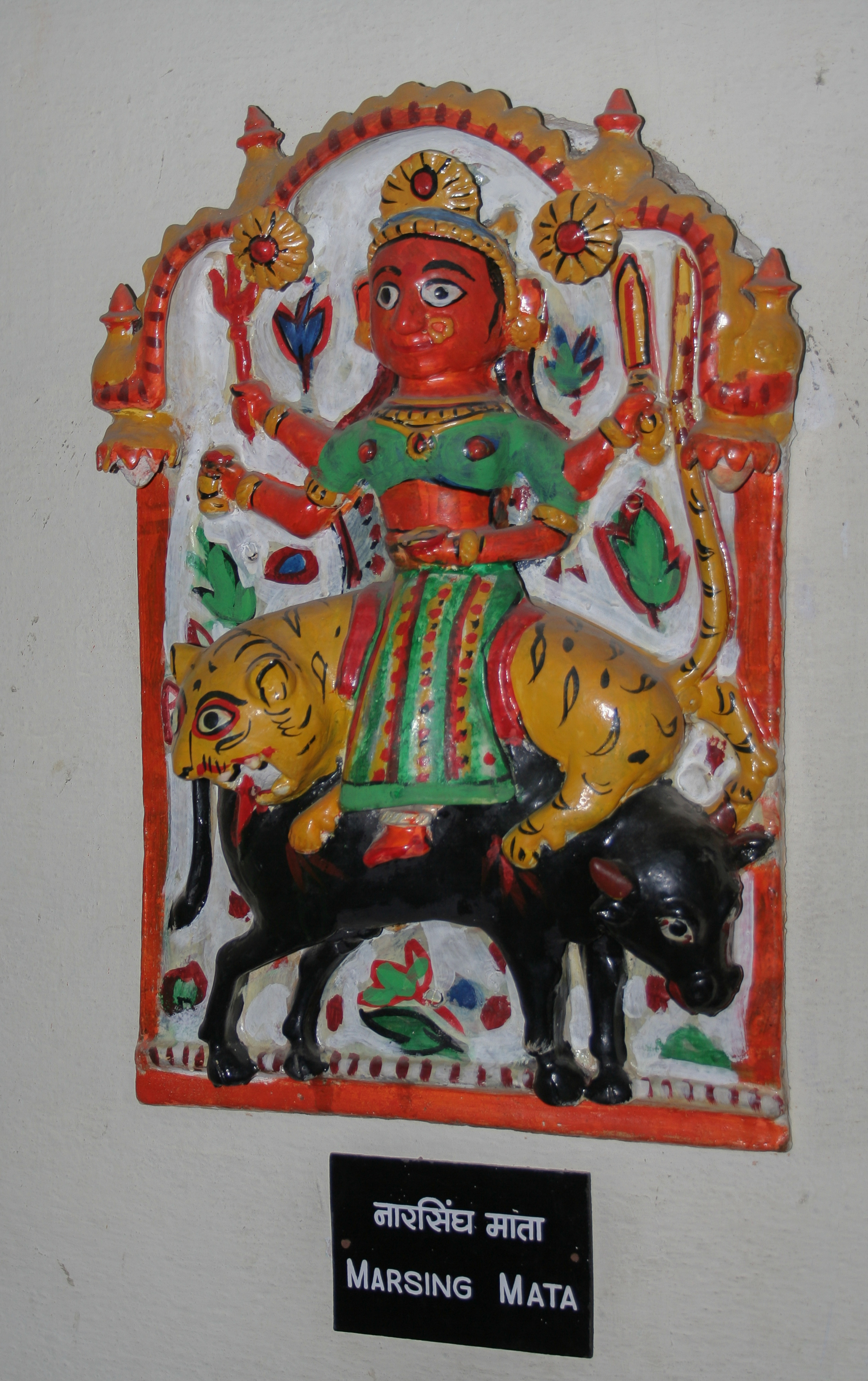
Narsing Mata

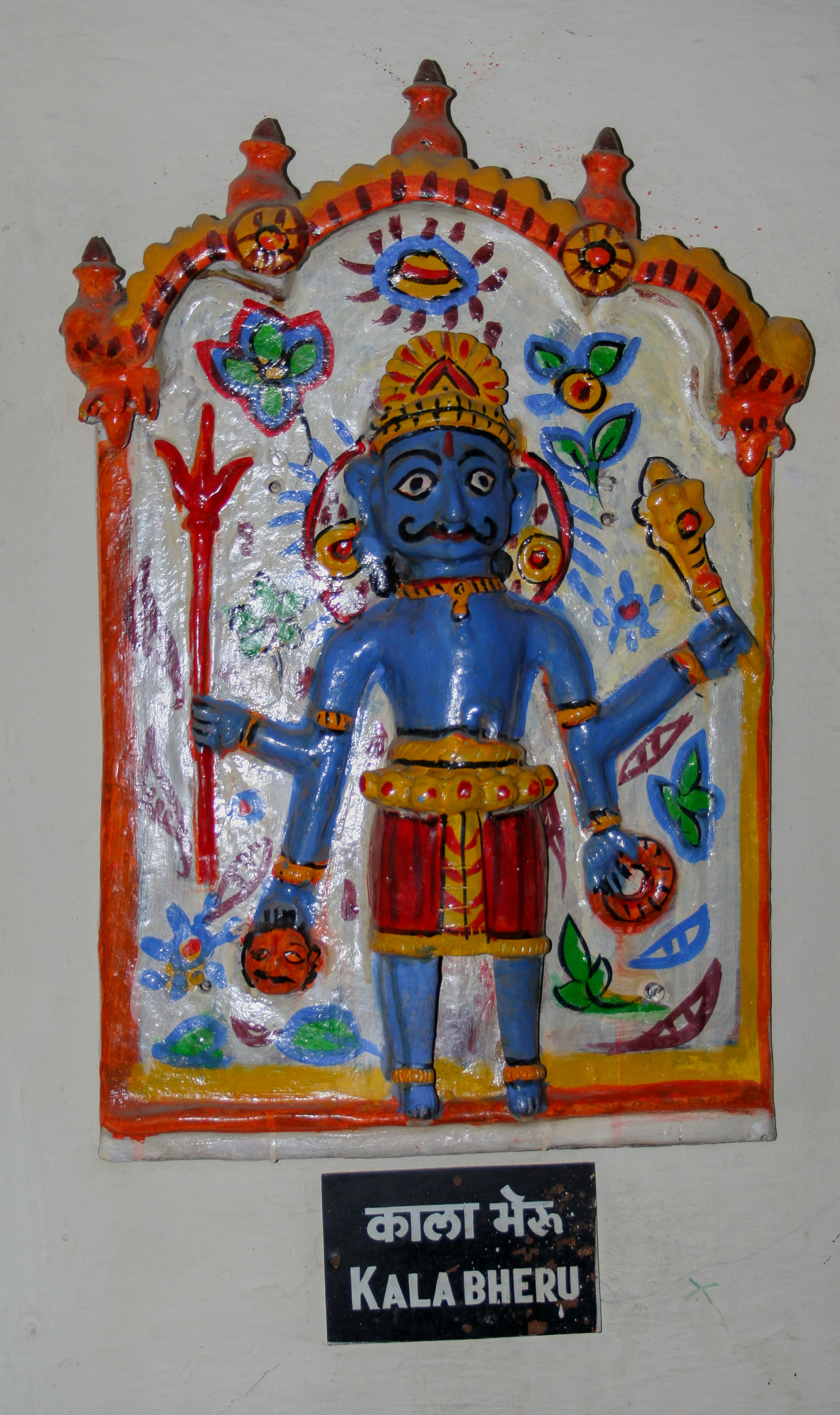
Kala Bheru

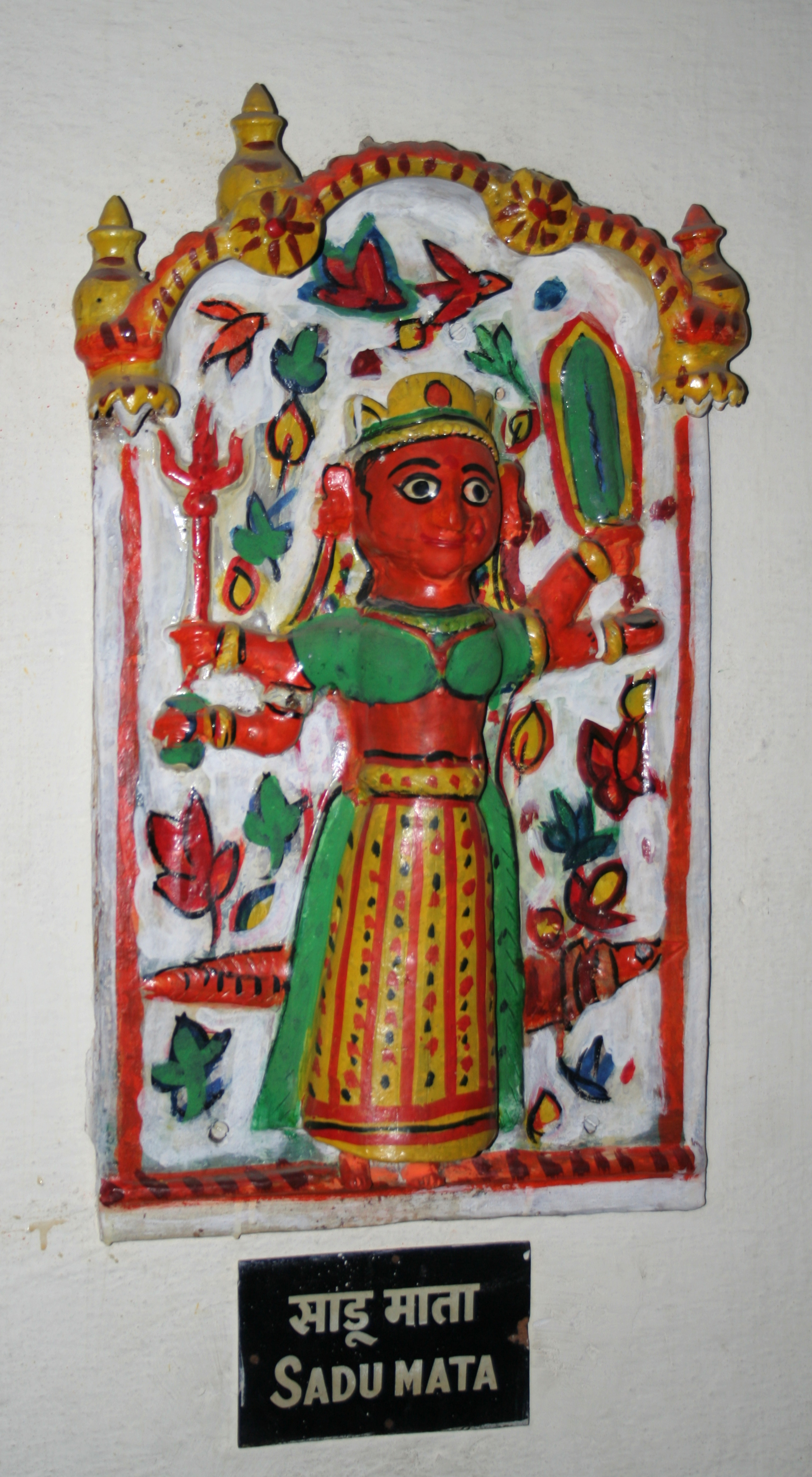
Sadu Mata

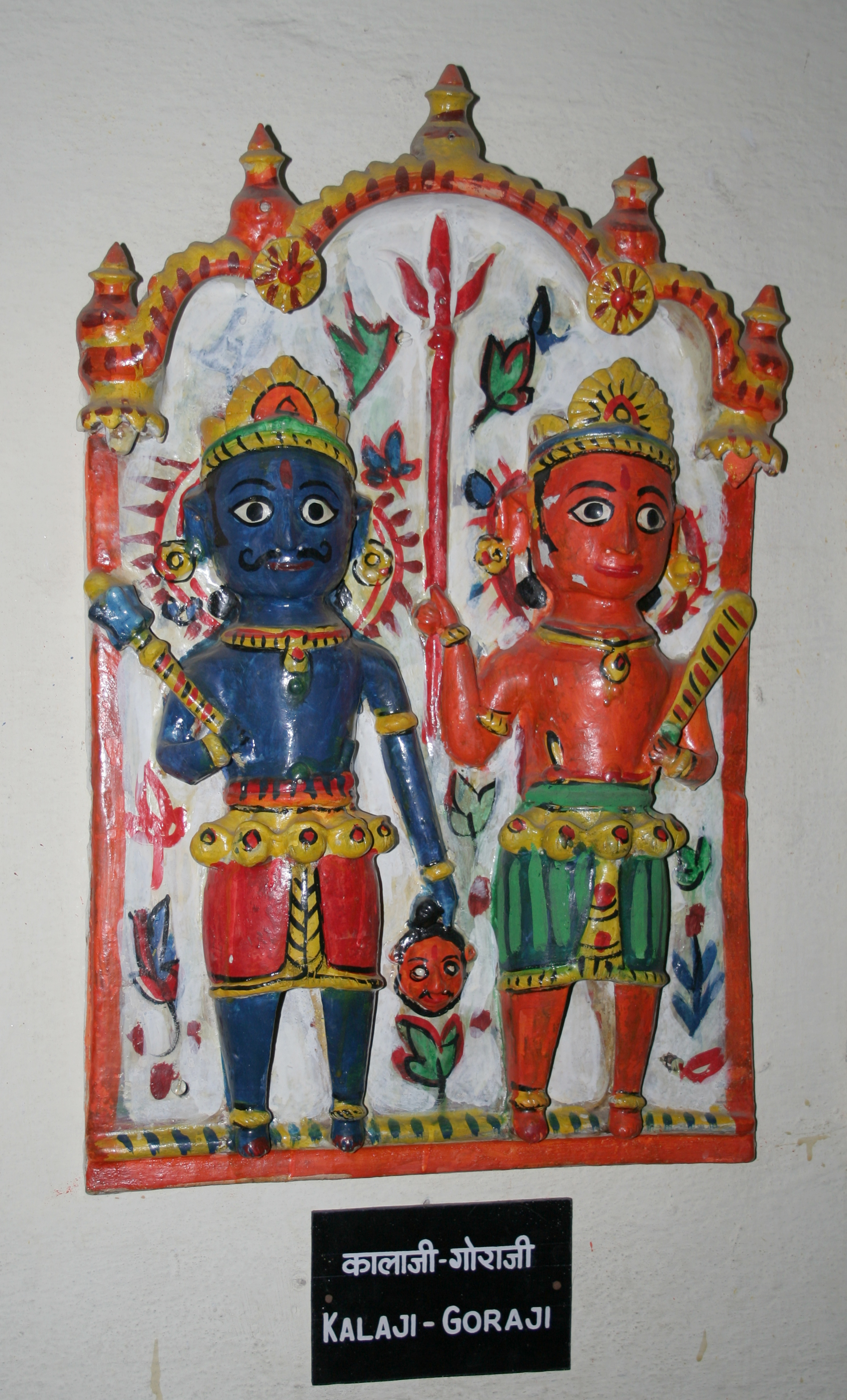
Kalaji - Goraji

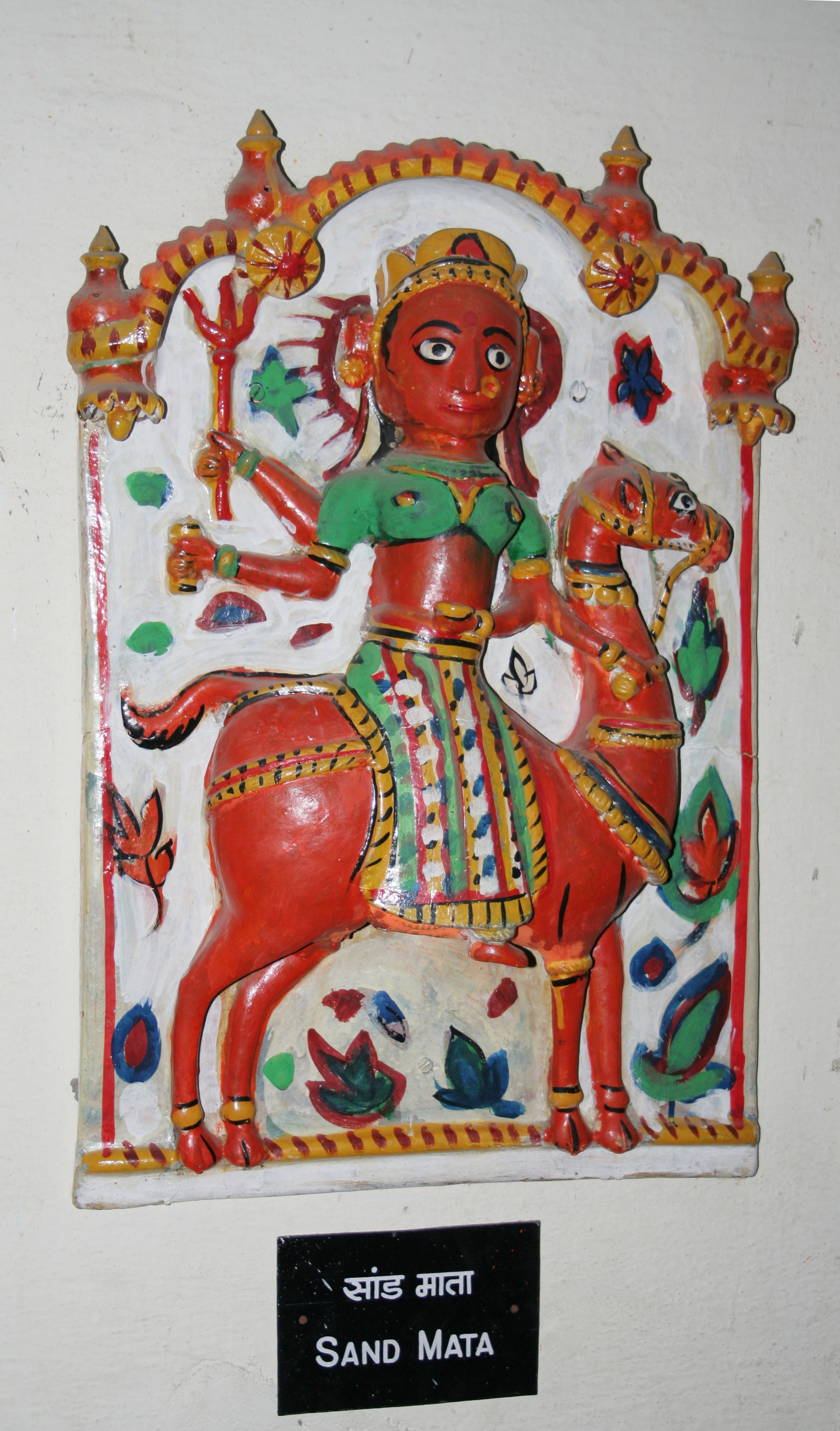
Sand Mata

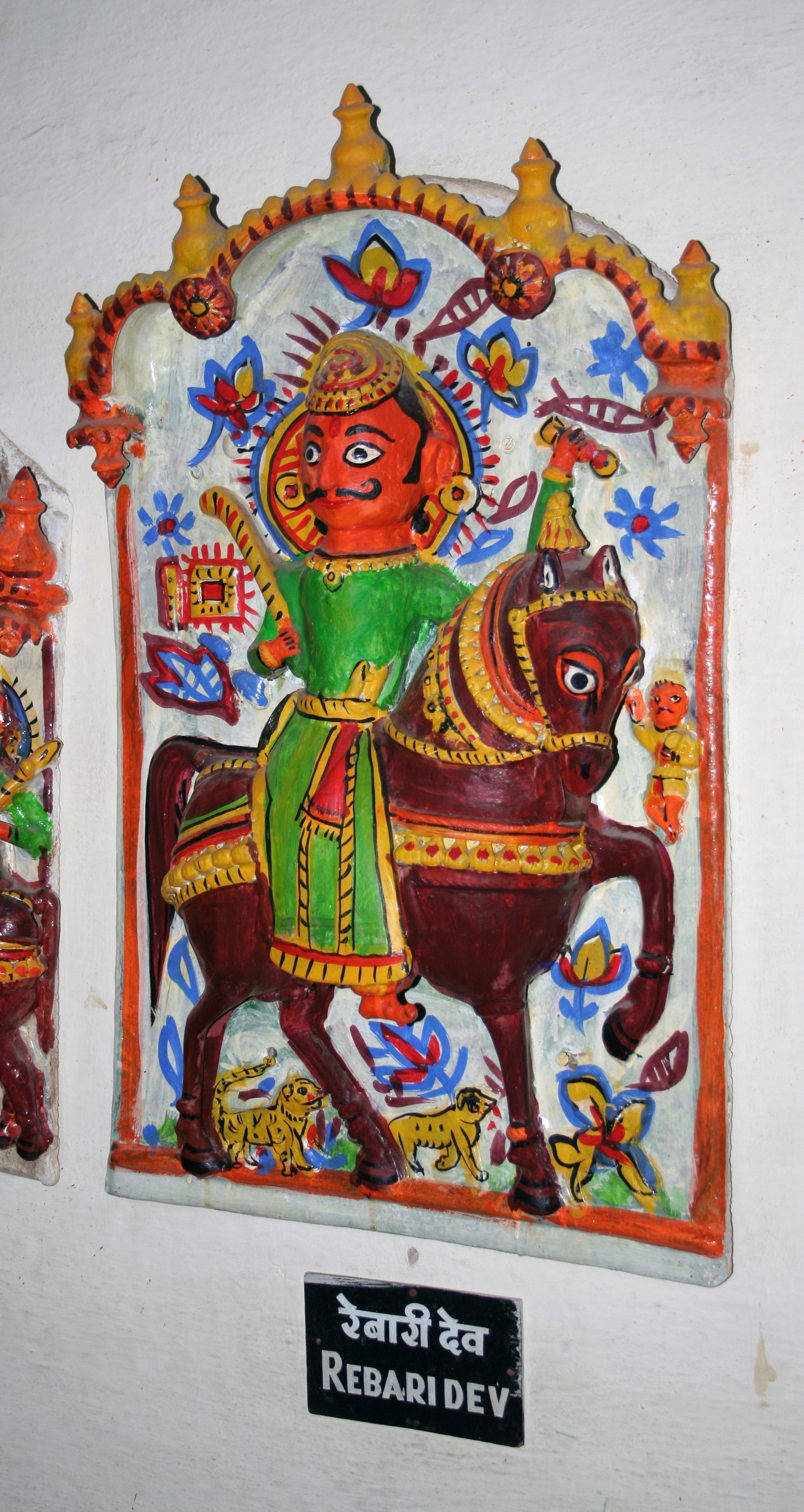
Rebari dev

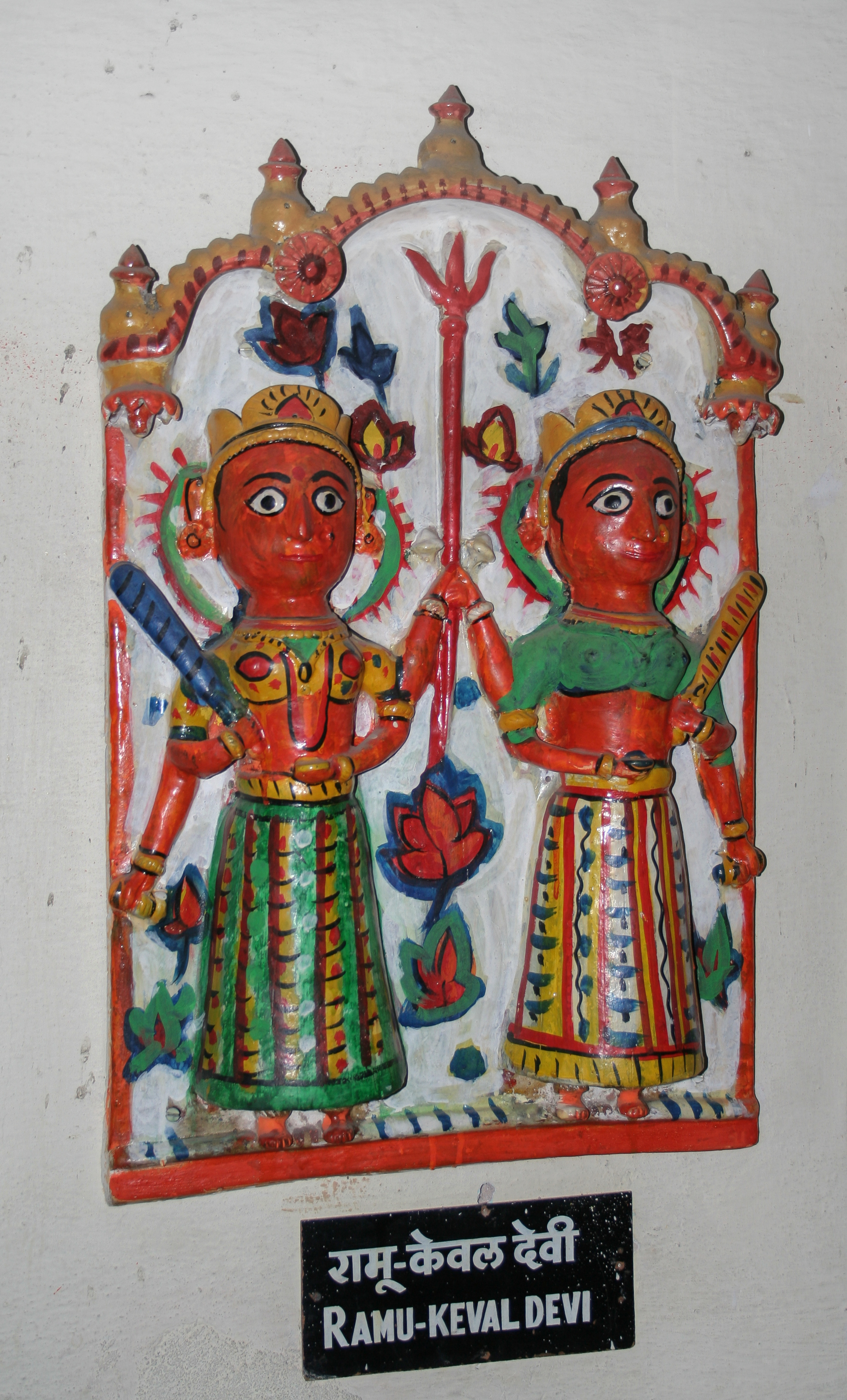
Ramu-Keval Devi

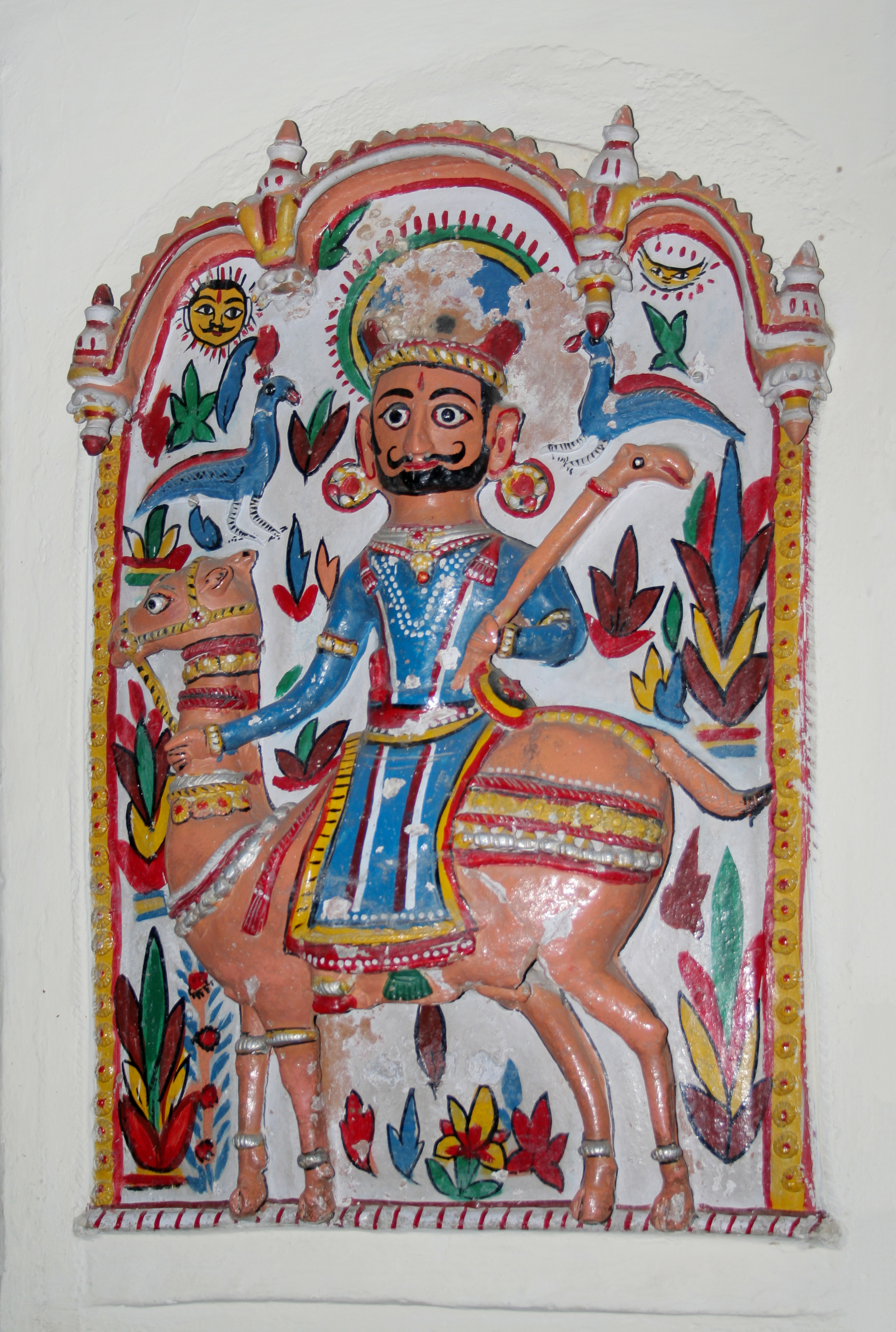

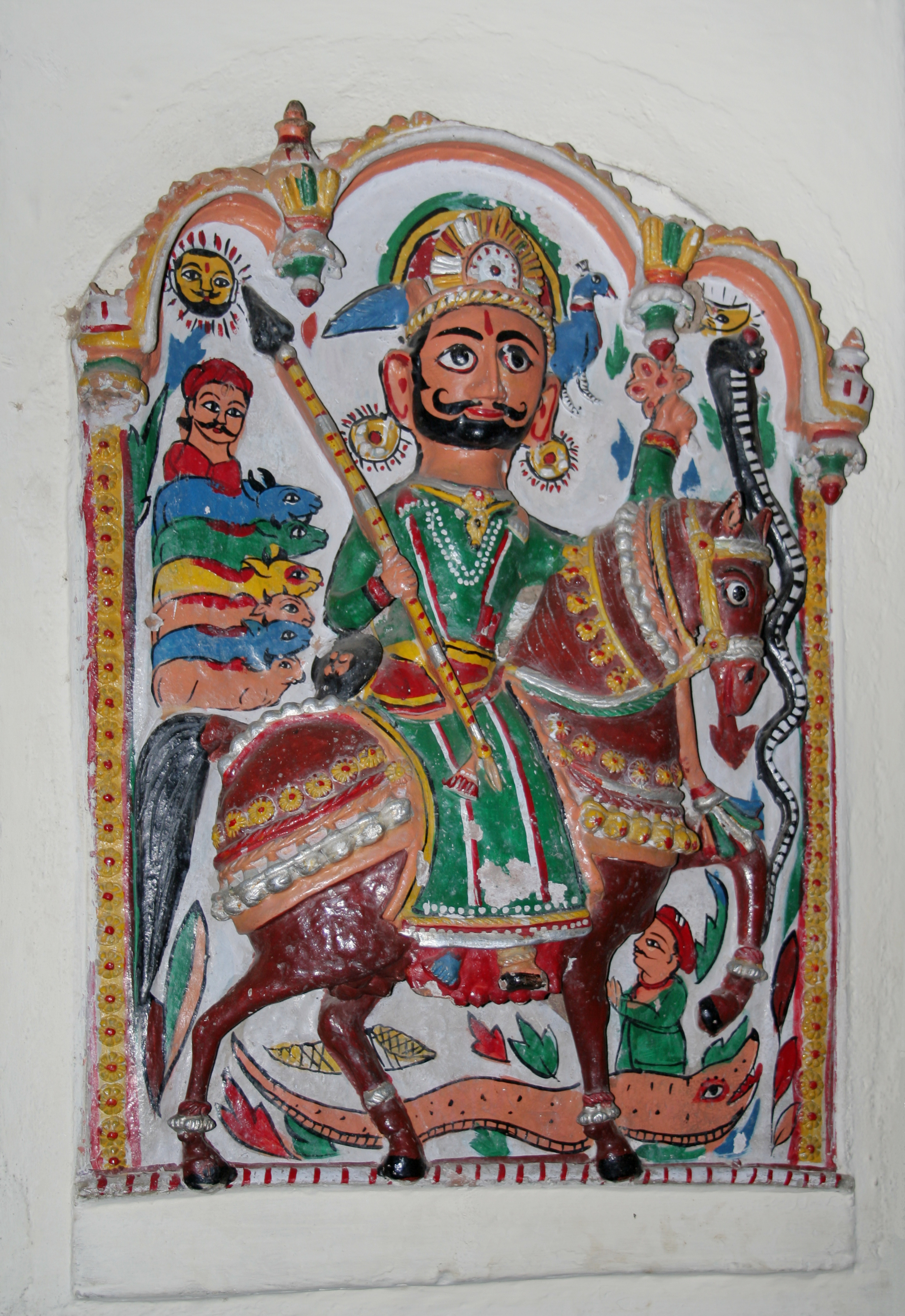

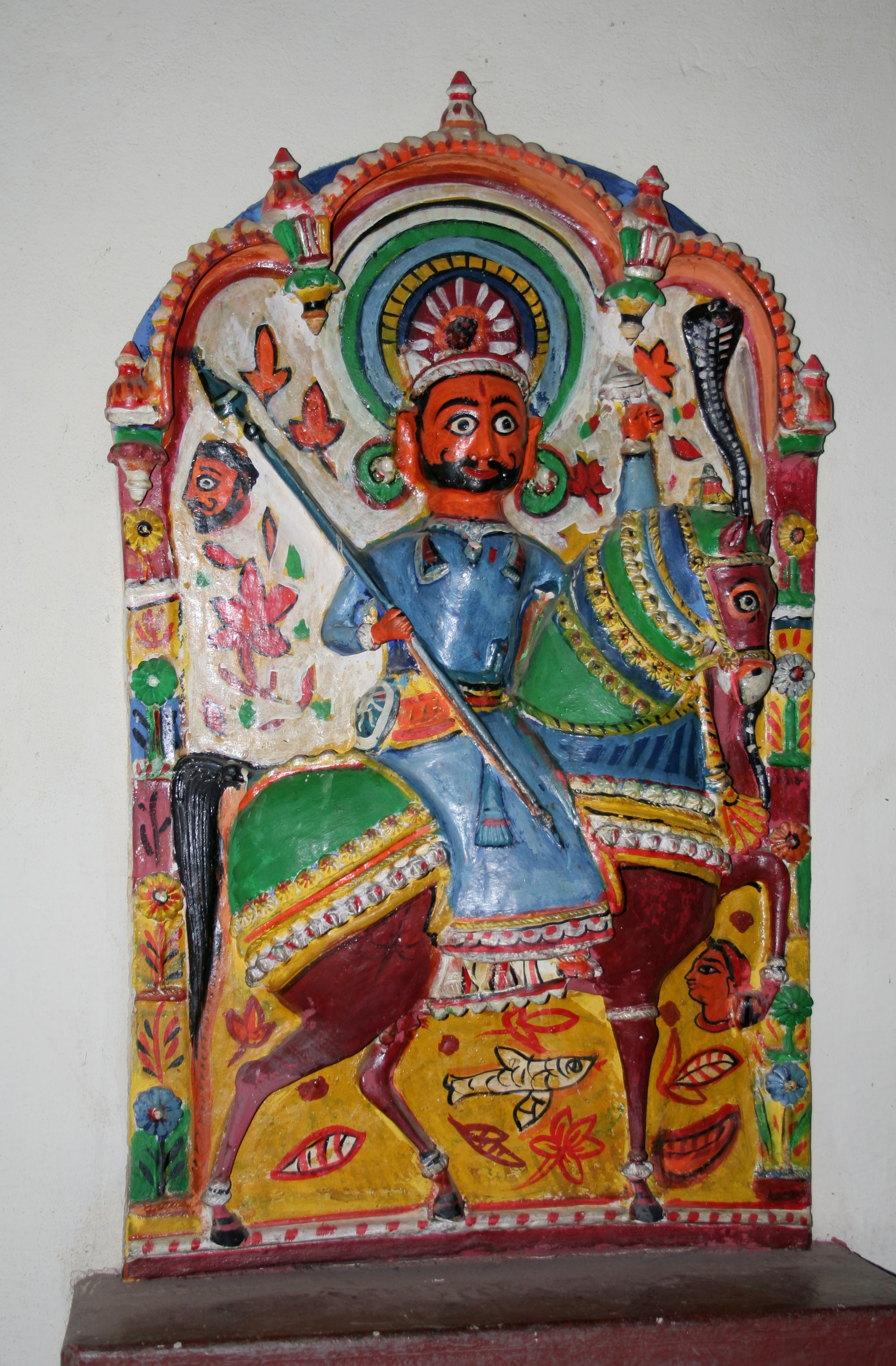

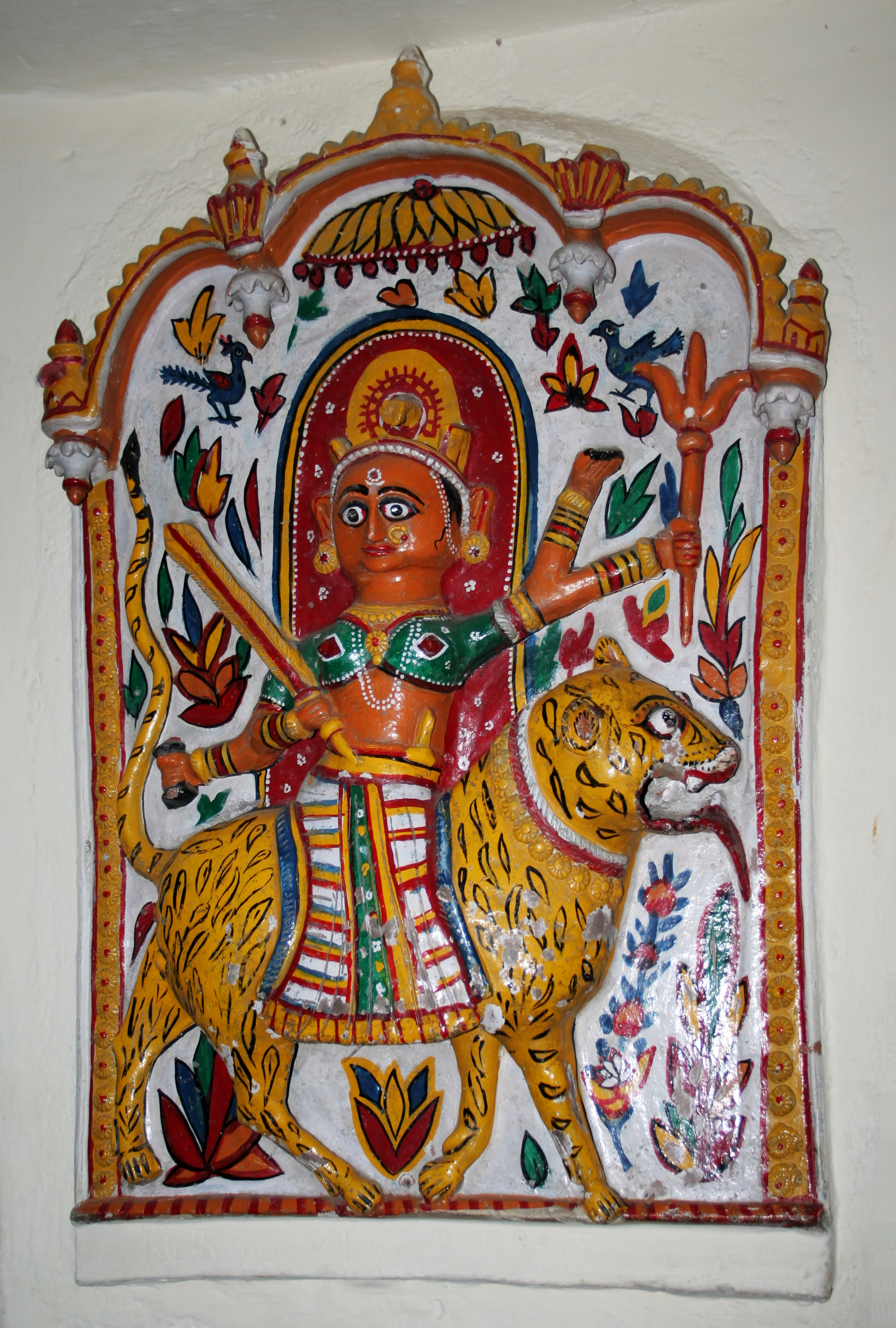

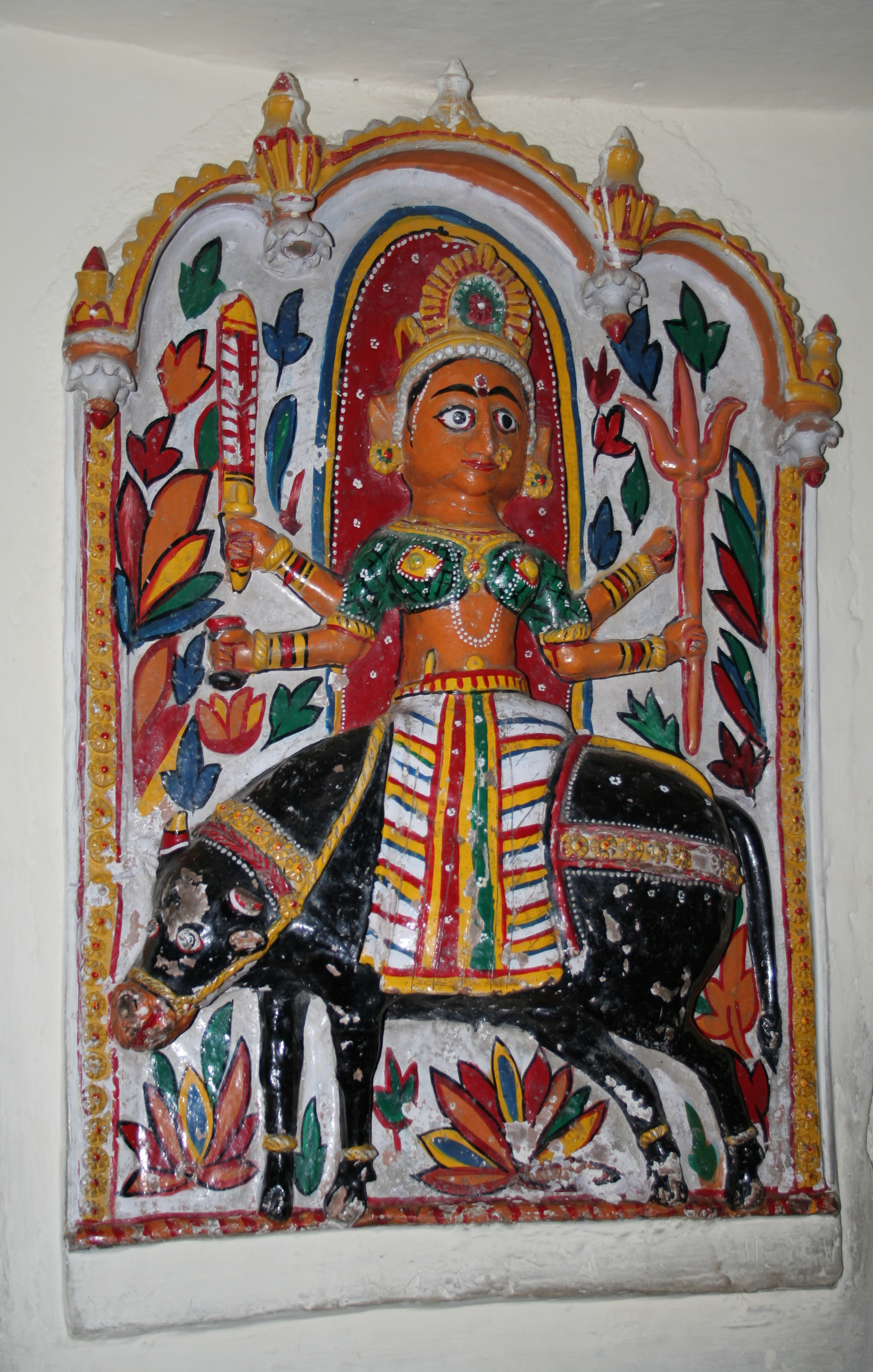

Other items

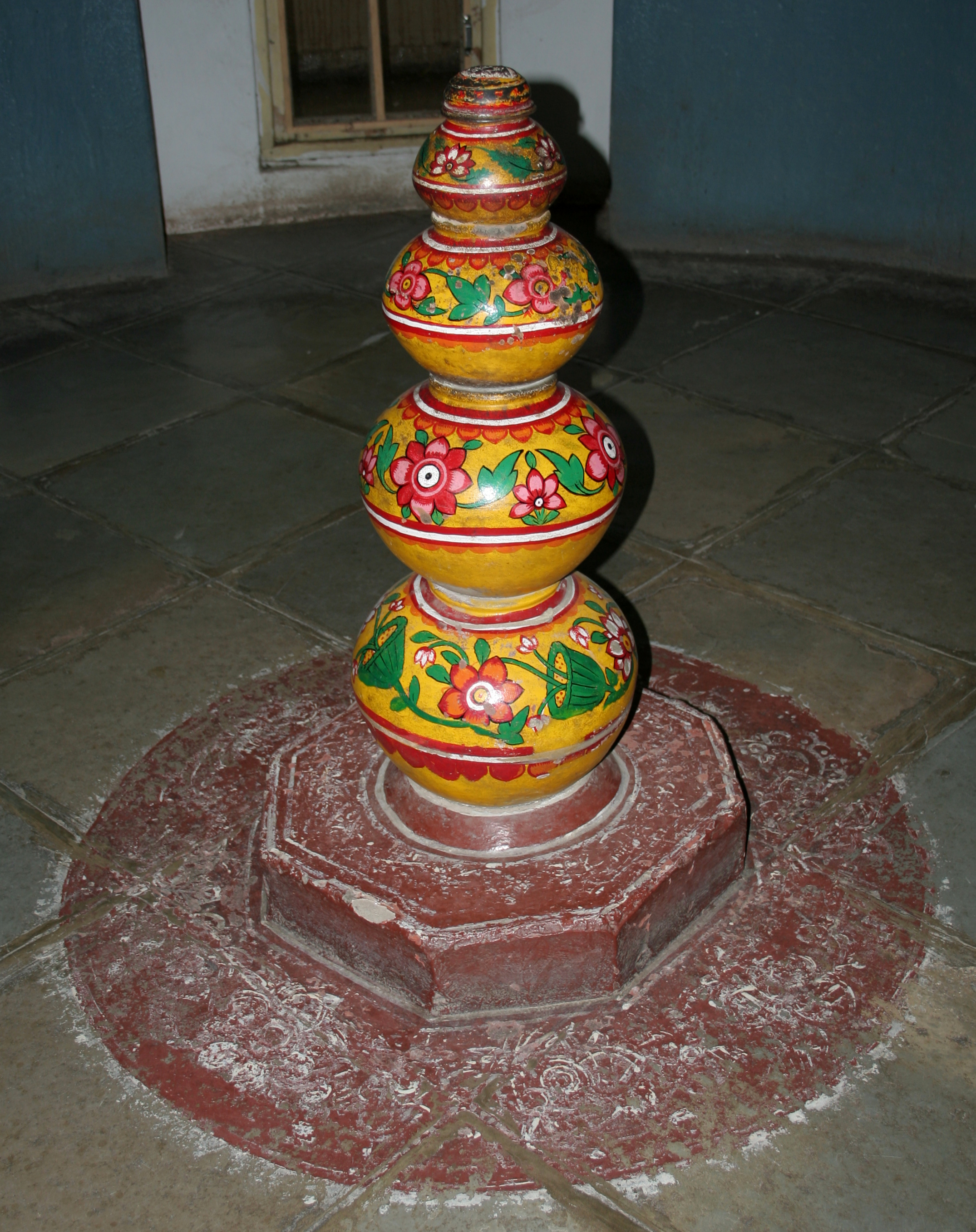
Ritual pots

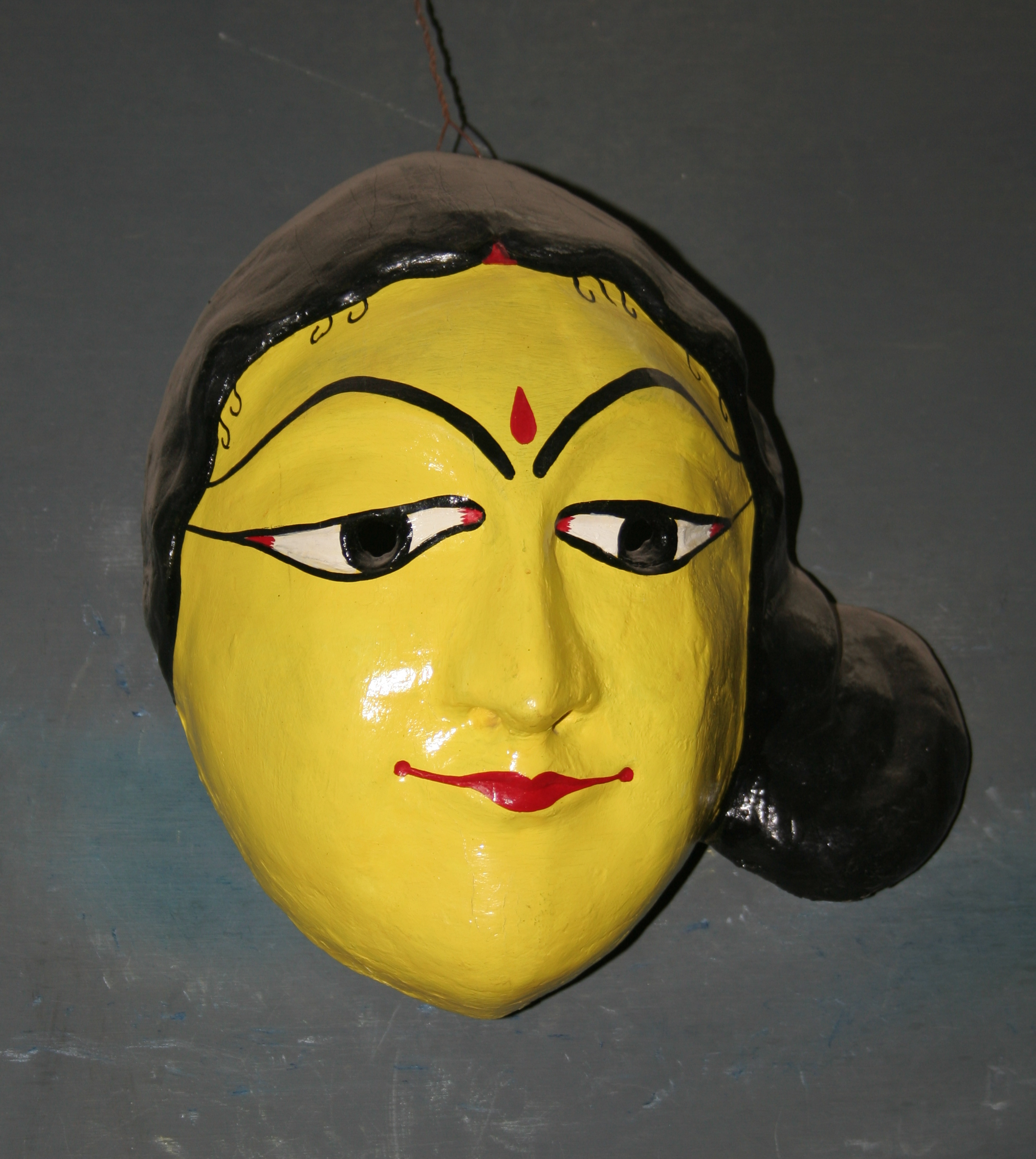
Mask

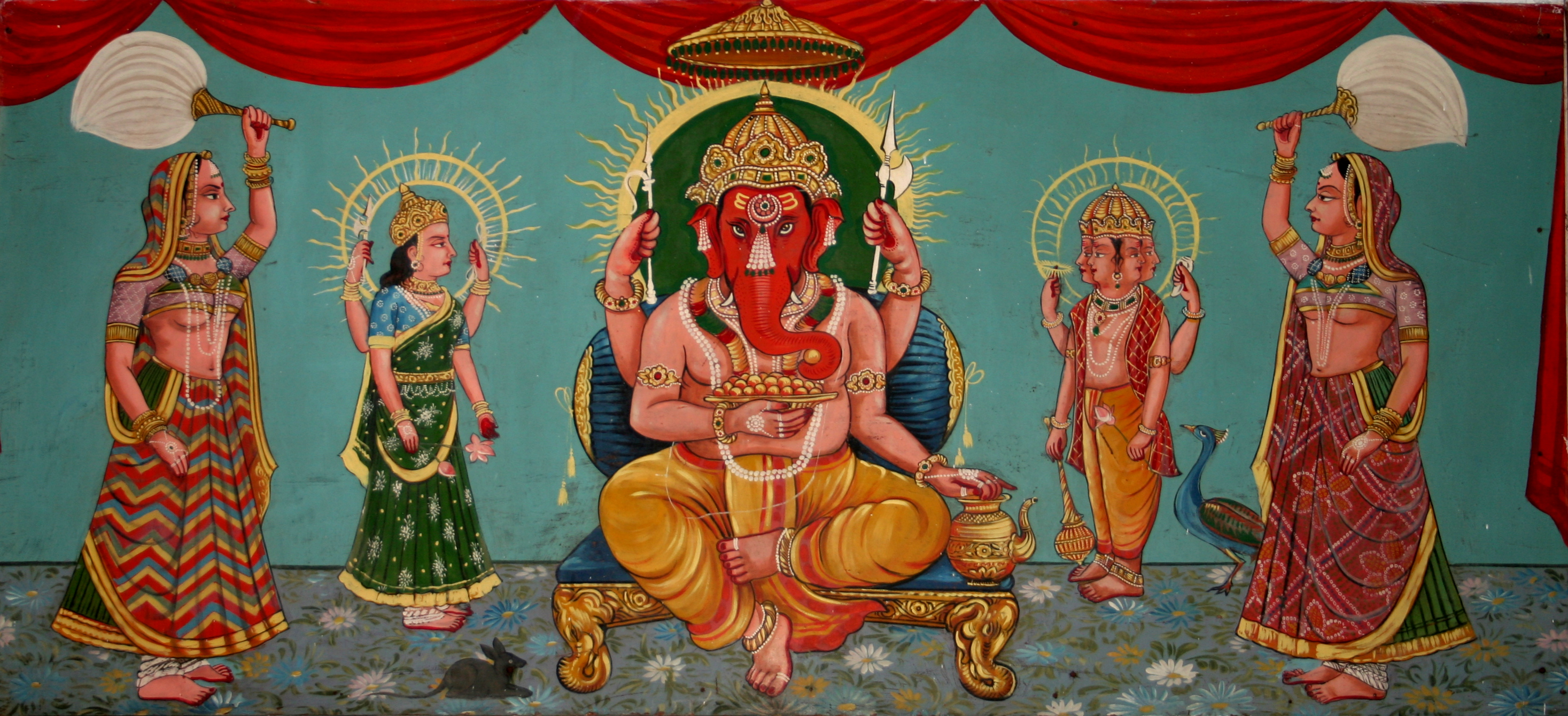
Painting of Ganesha

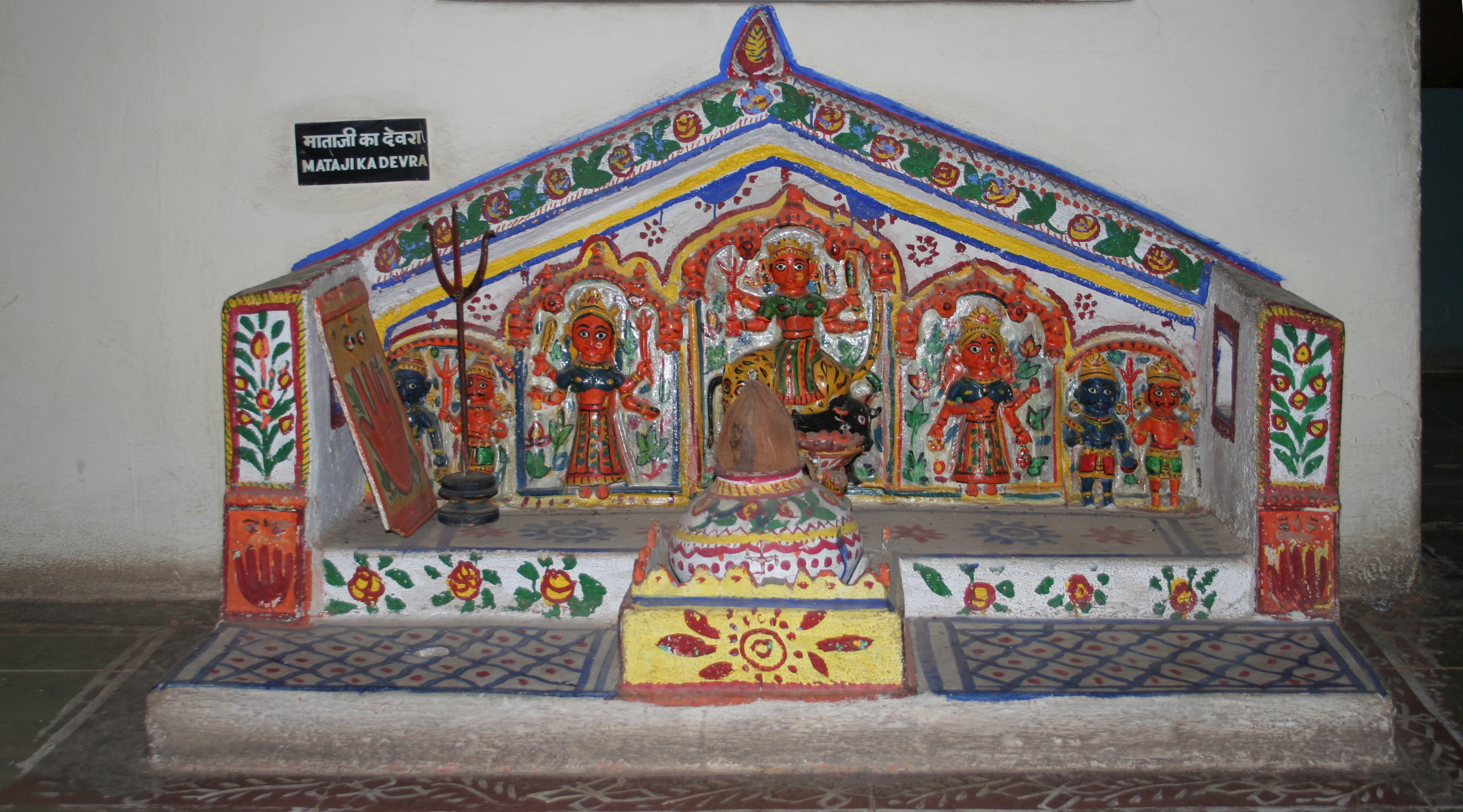
Place of worship for Mataji

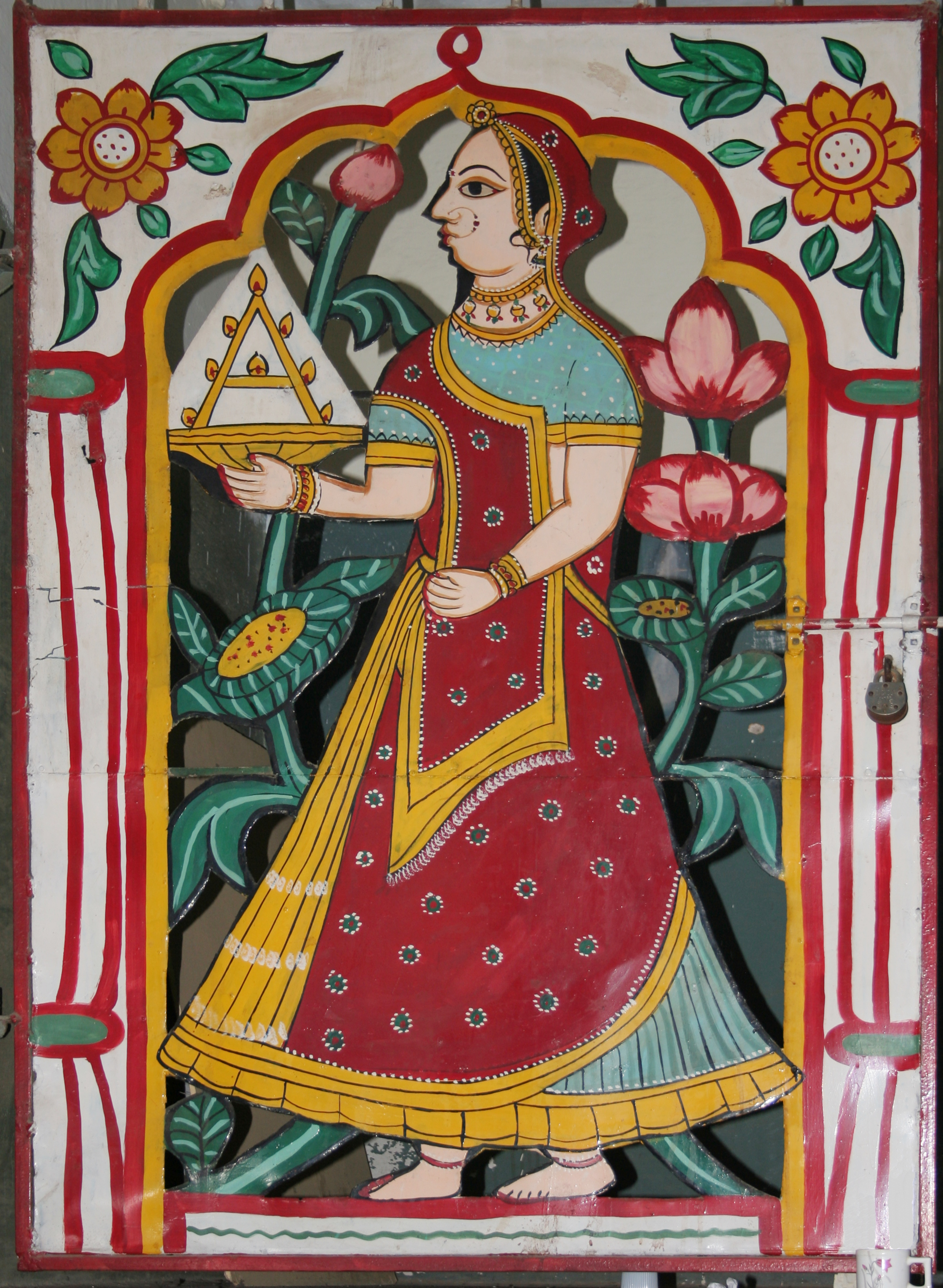
Wood painting

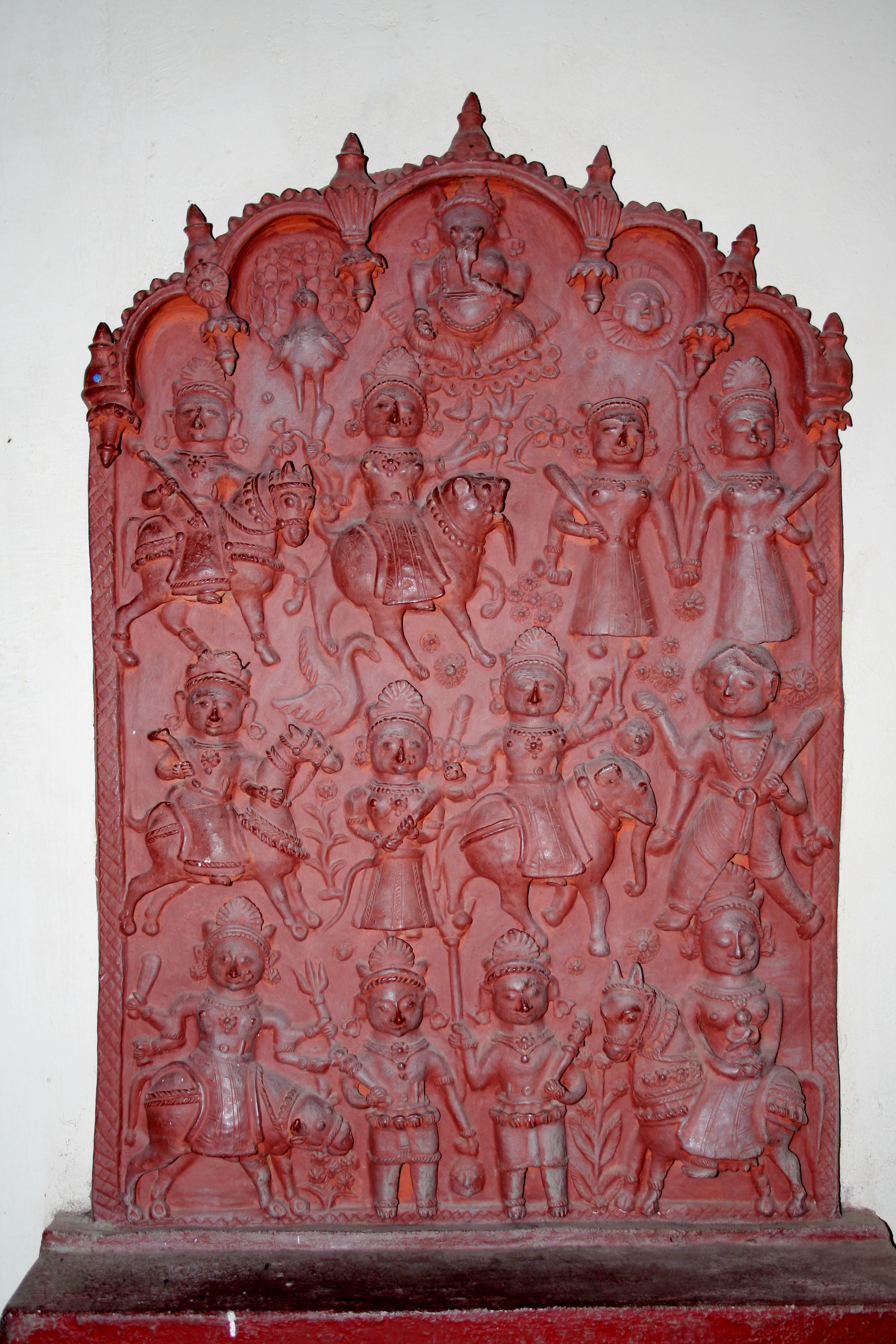

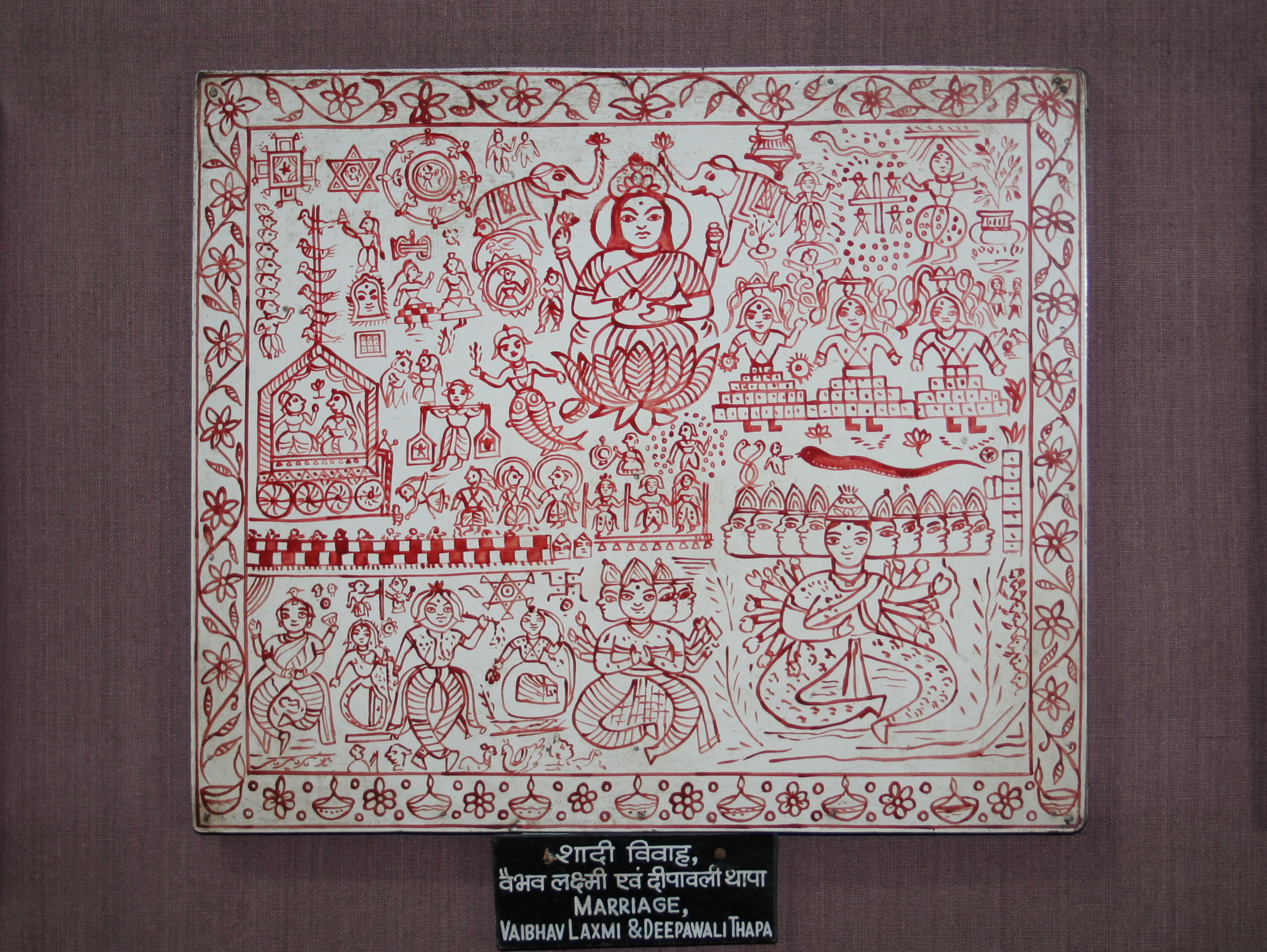
Drawing

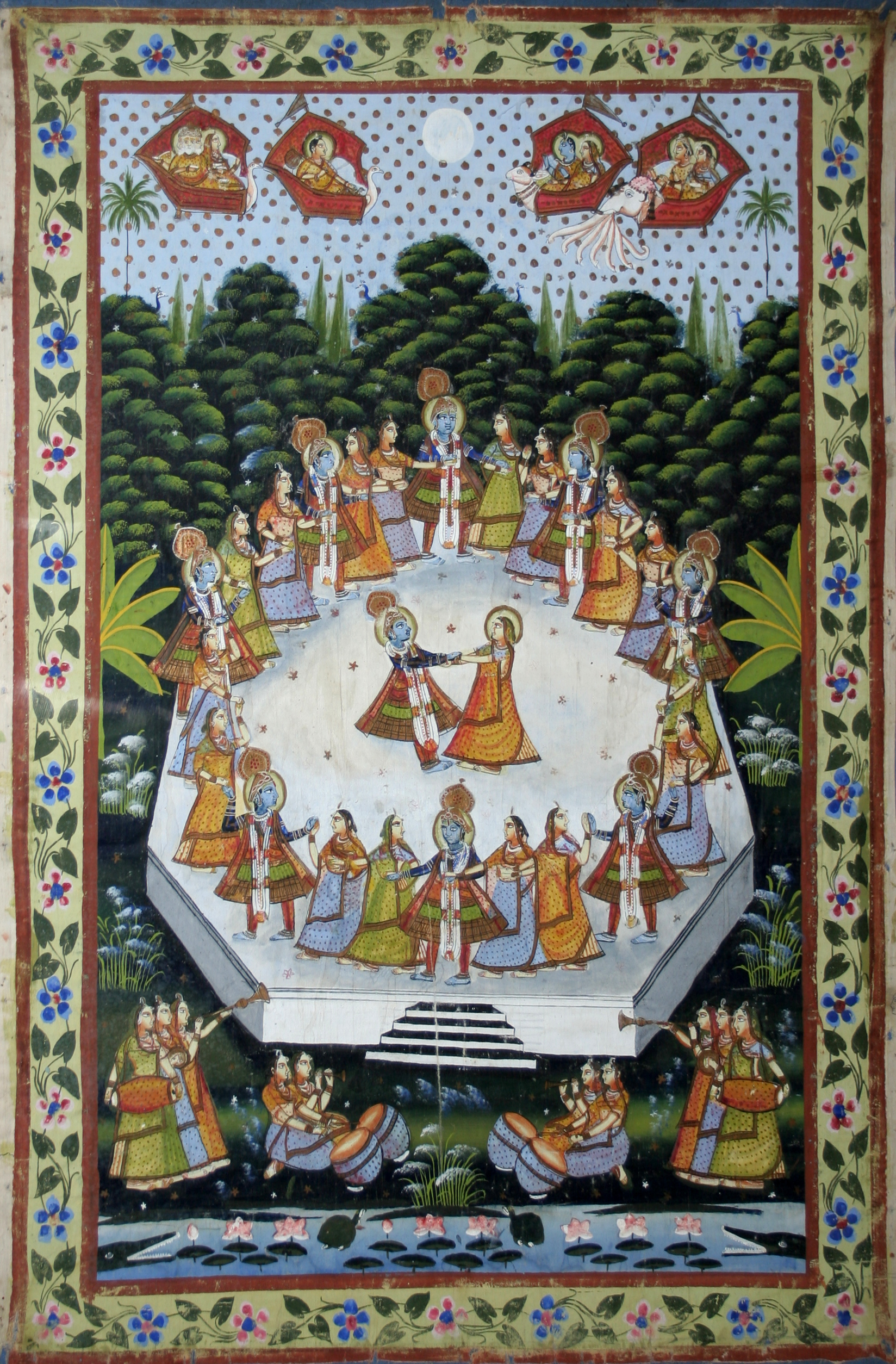
Radha, Krishna and the gopis

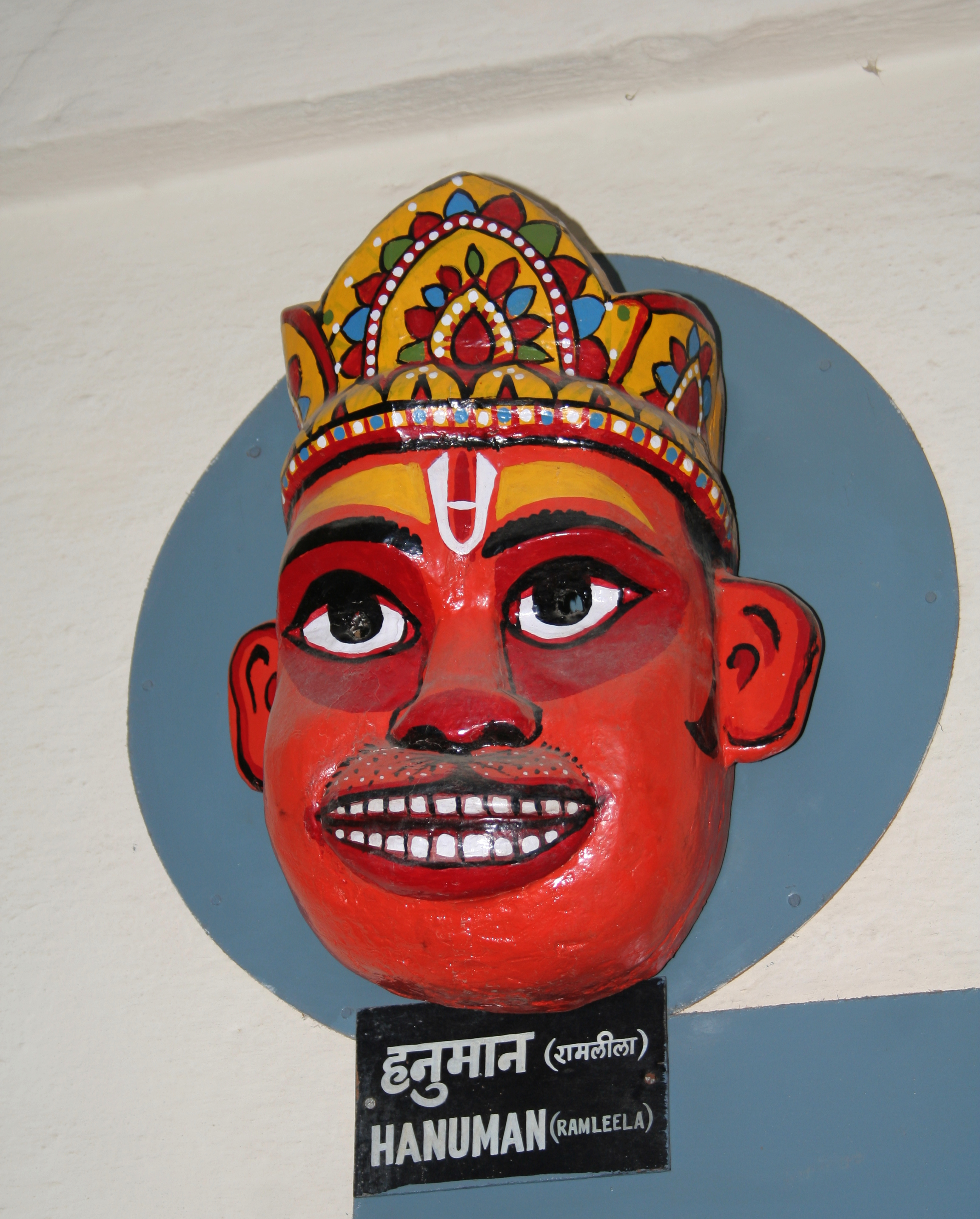
Hanuman (Ramleela)

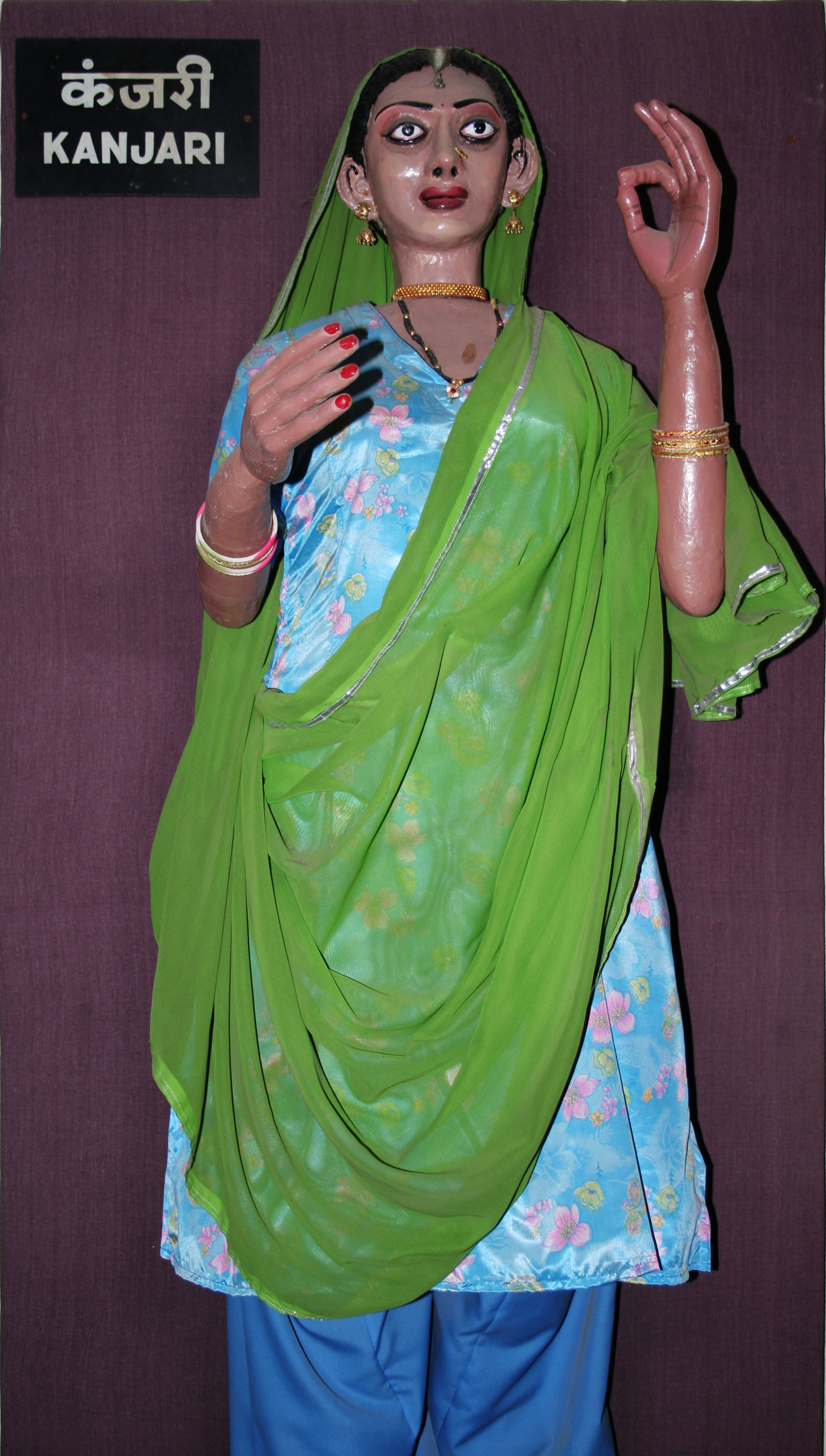
Full-sized puppet

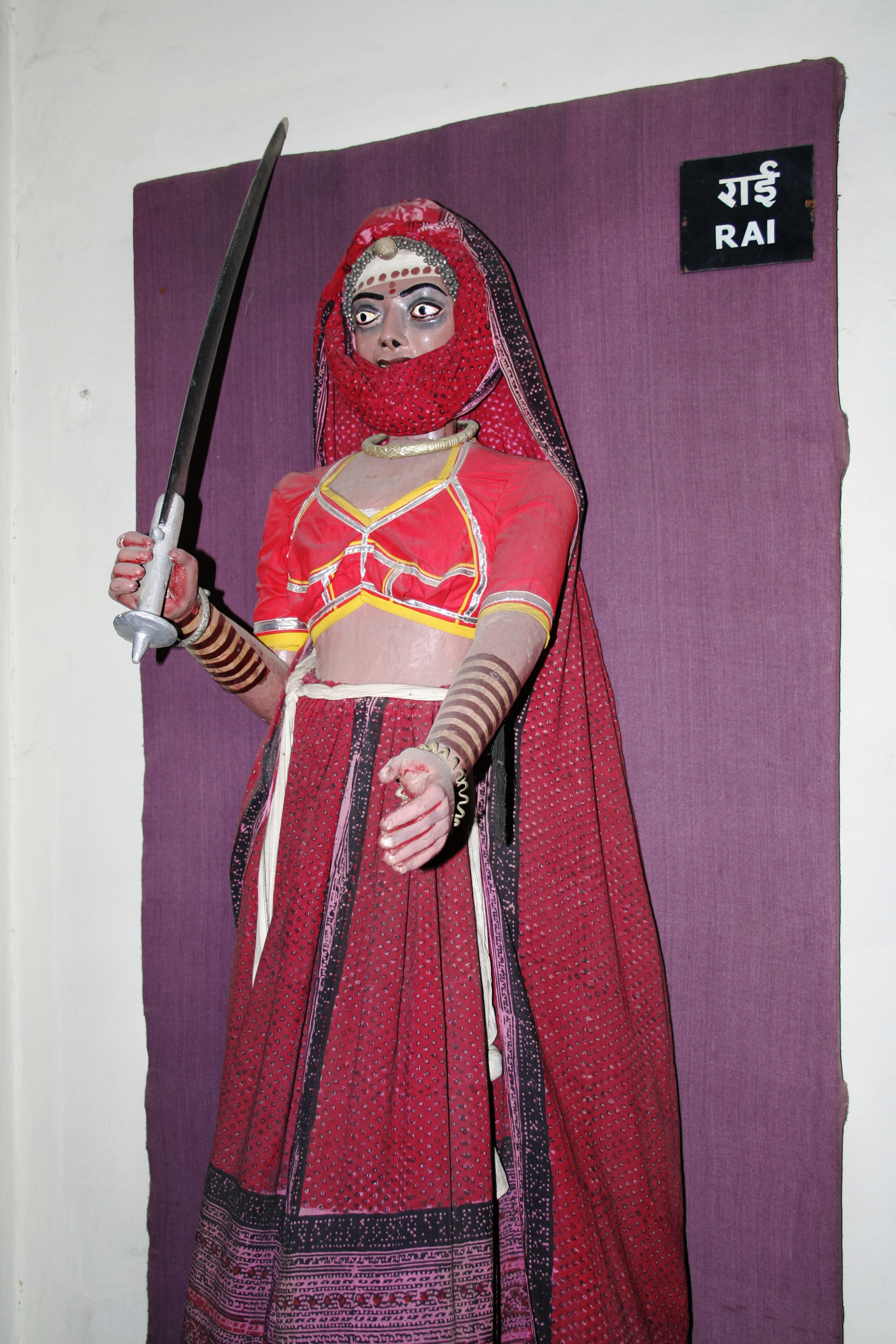
Full-sized puppet

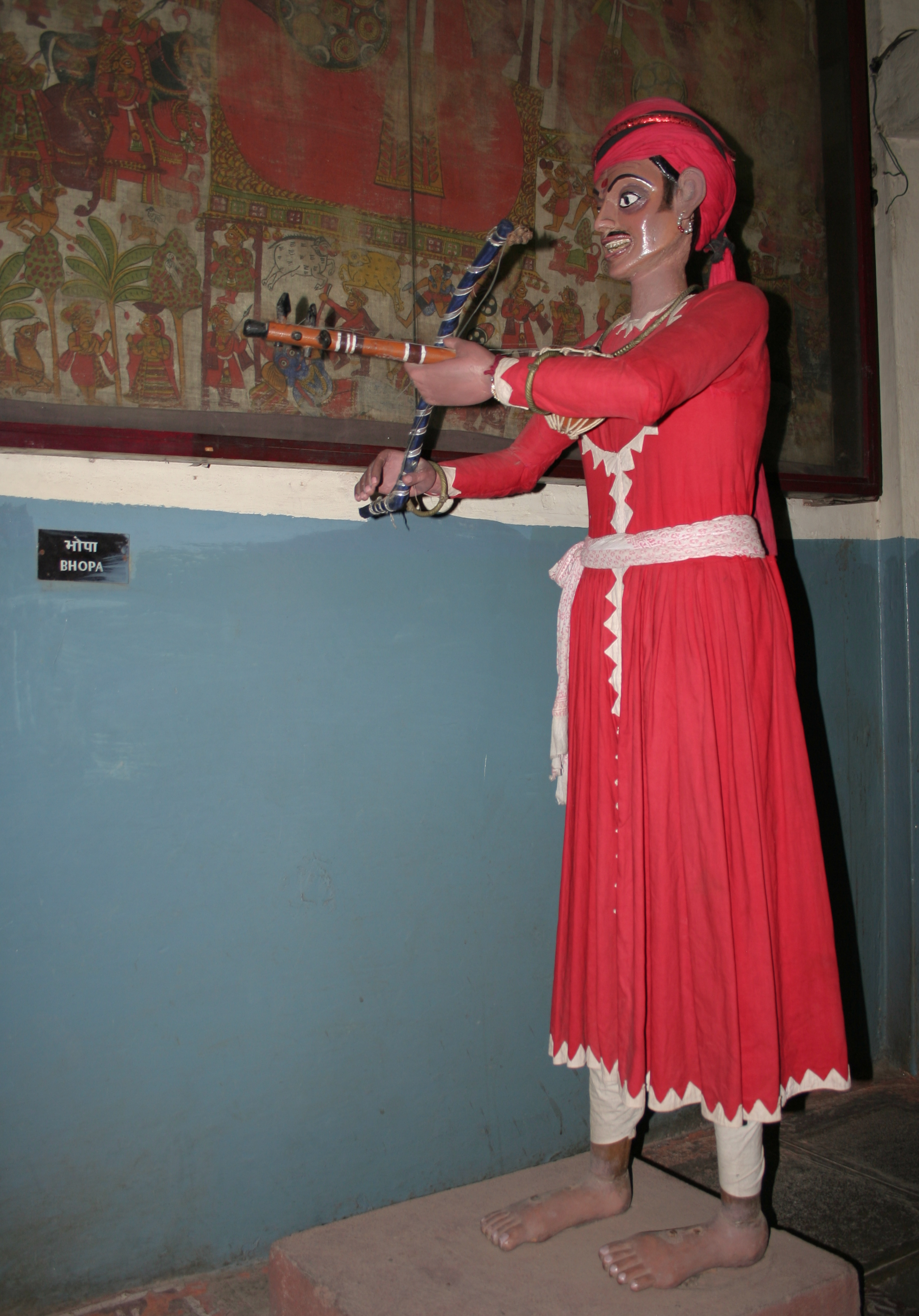
Full-sized puppet

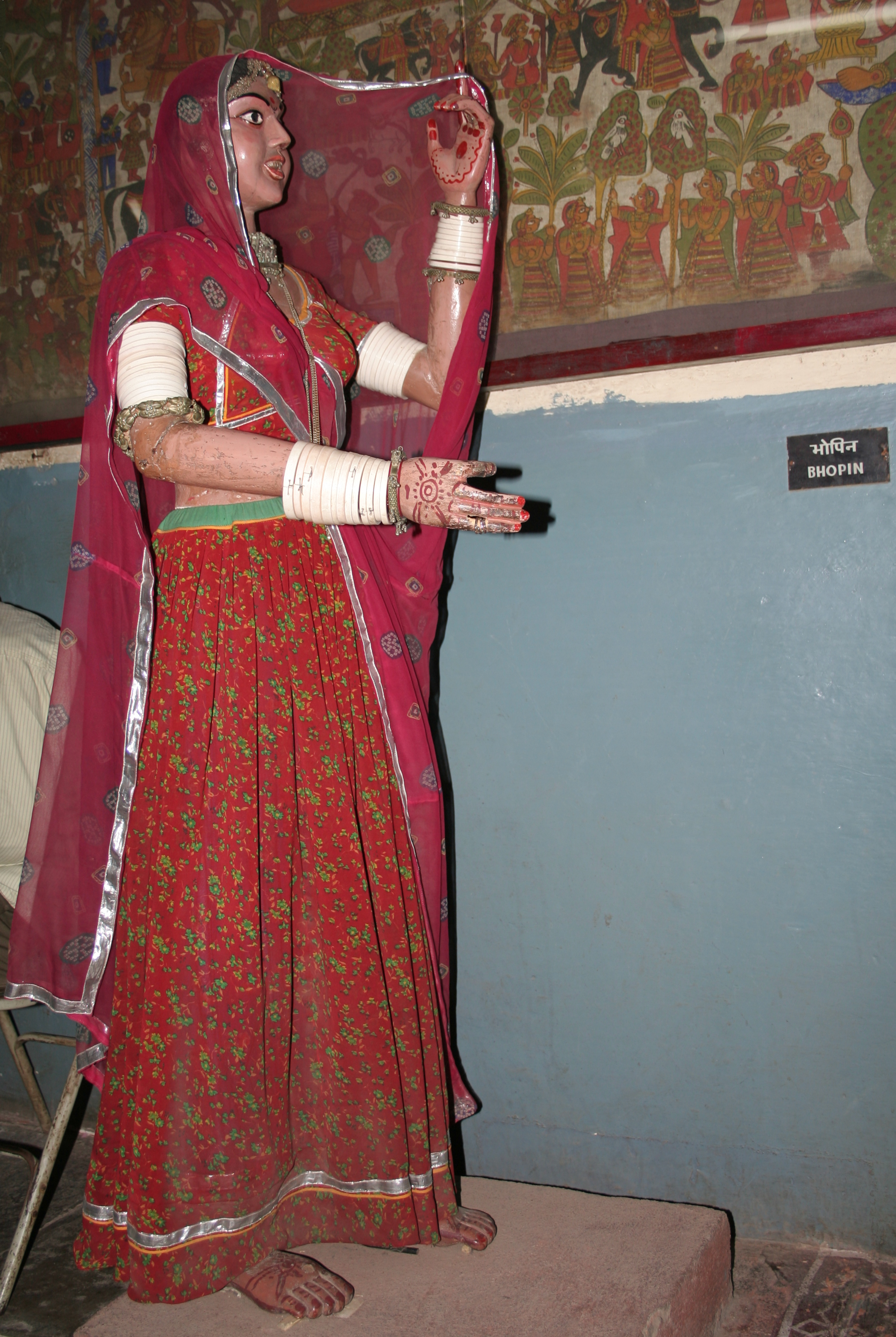
Full-sized puppet

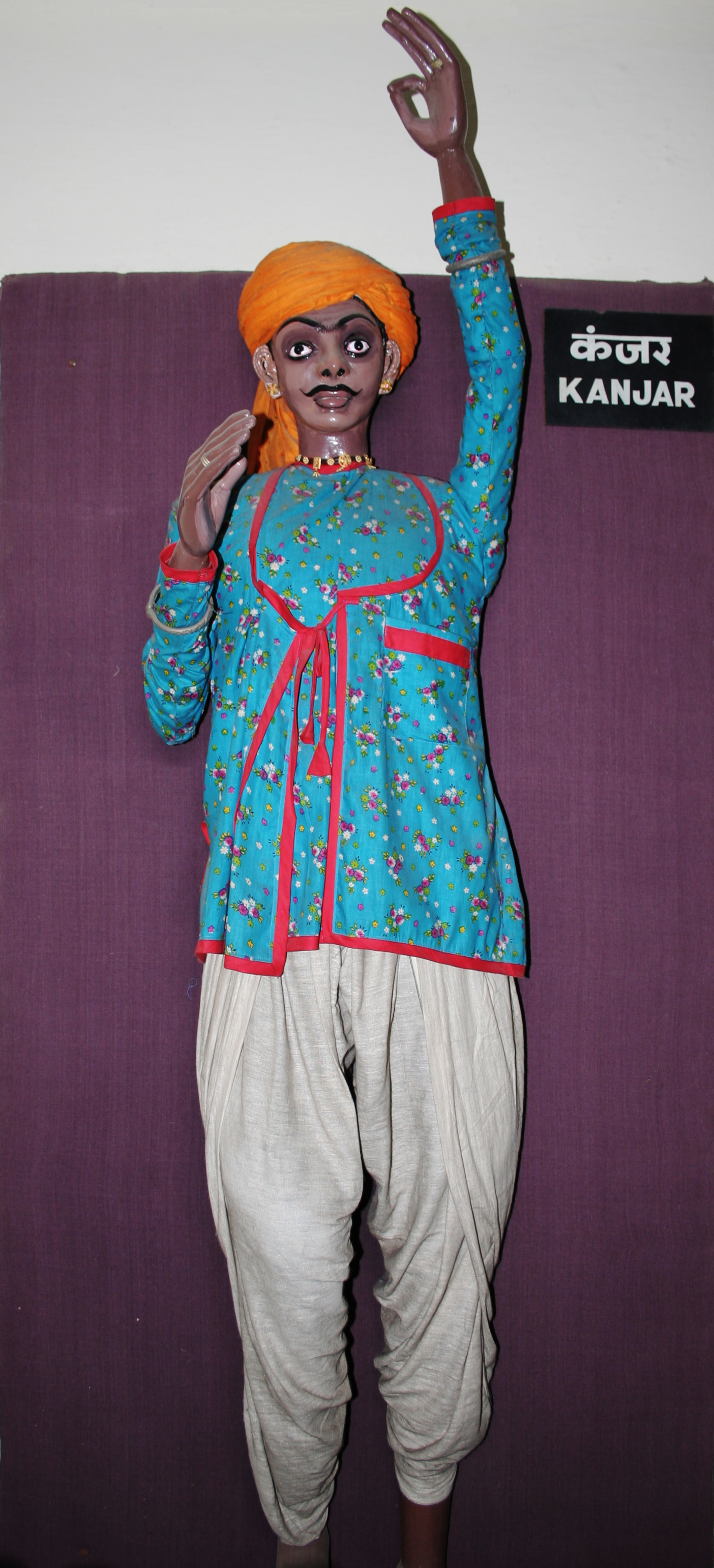
Full-sized puppet

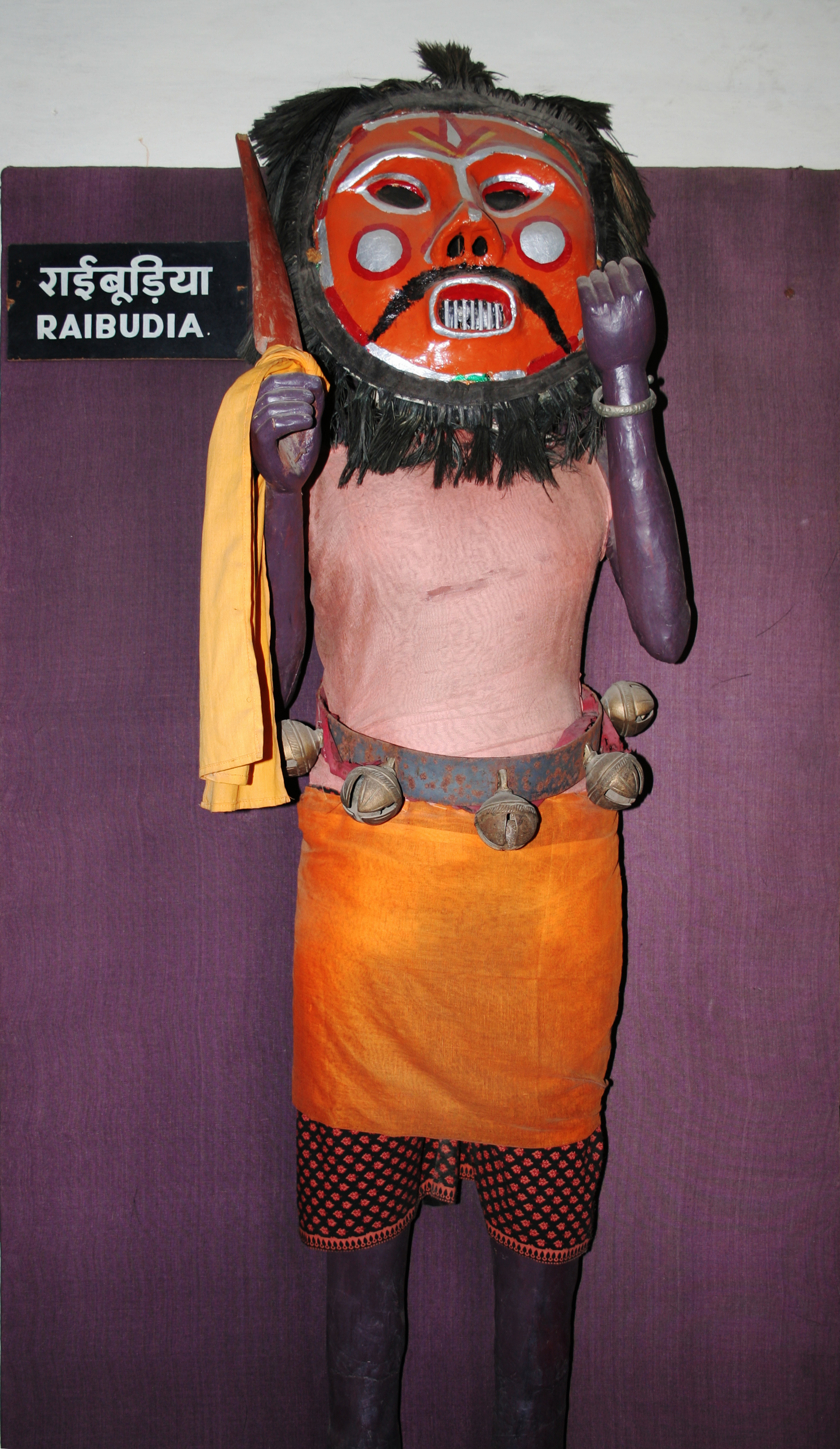
Full-sized puppet with mask

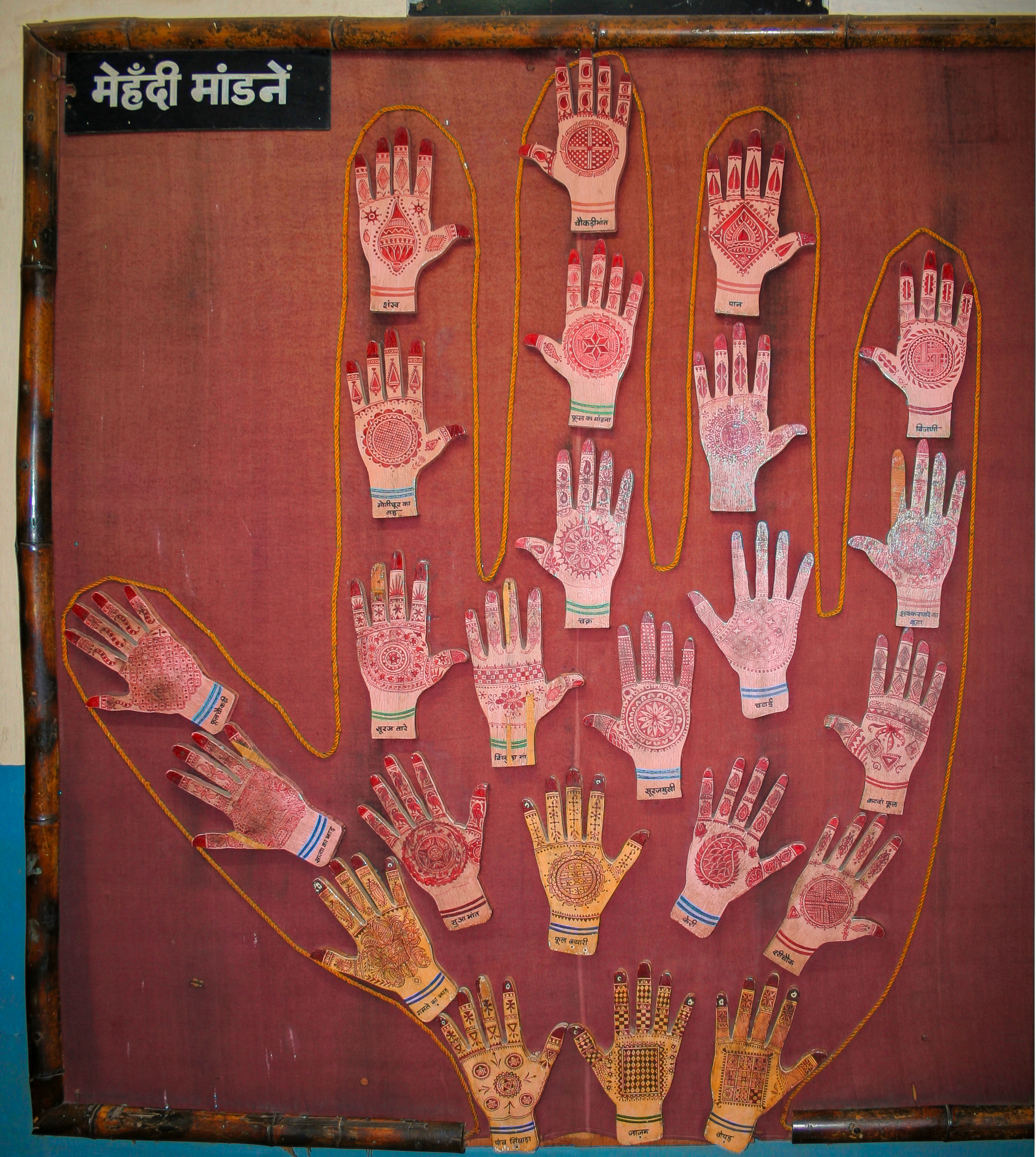
Design for henna tattoos

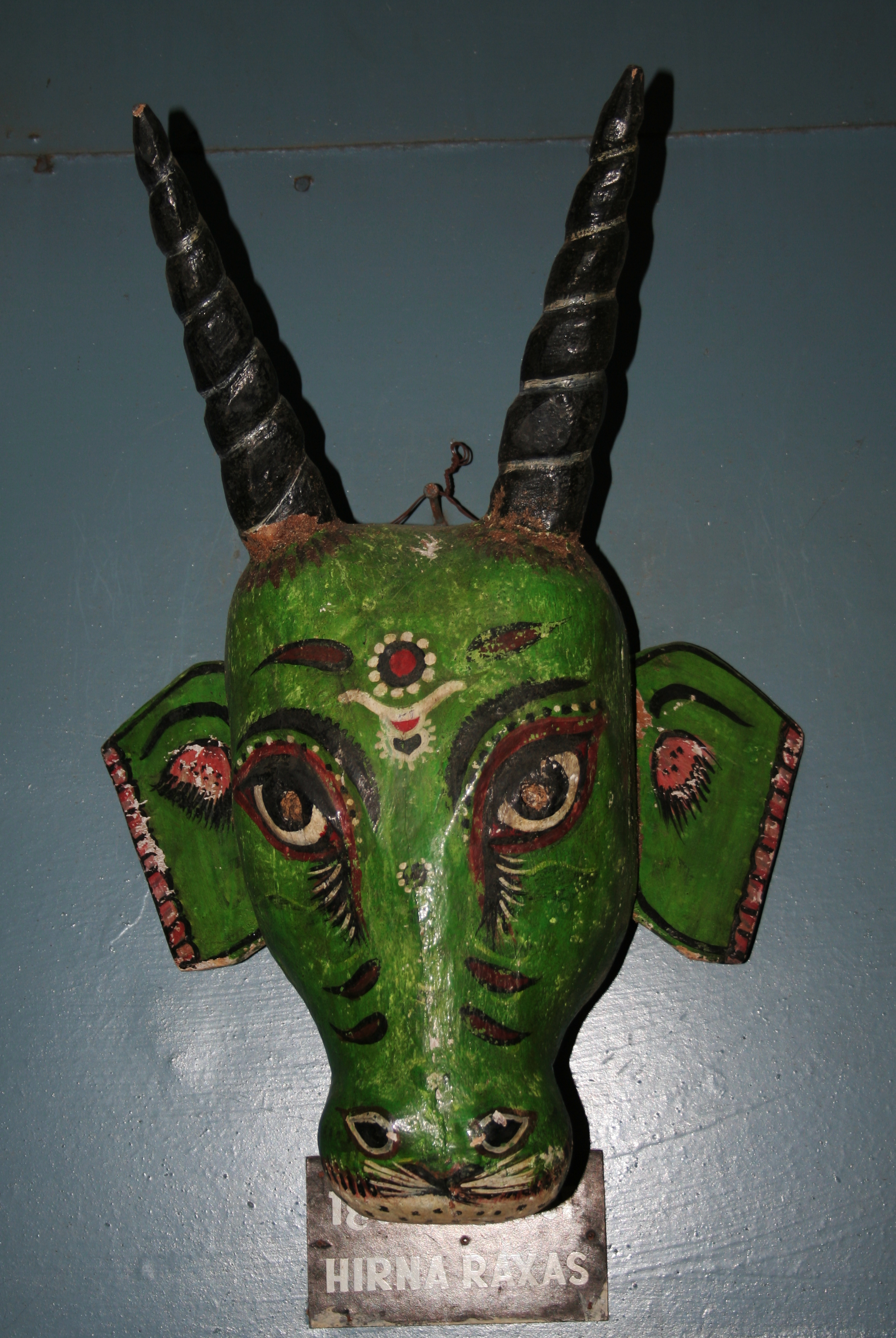

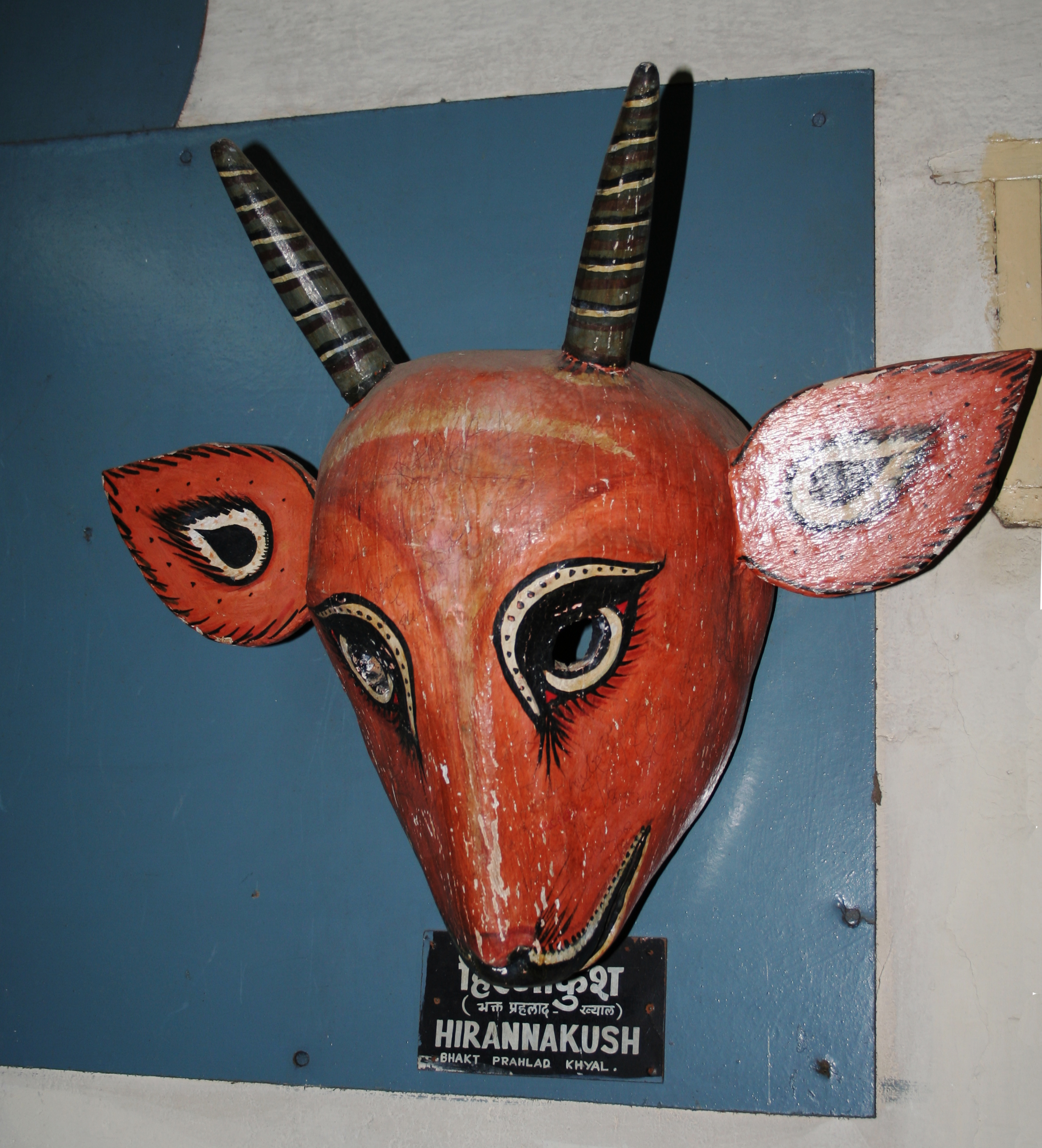
