= Shamar (given name) =

Shamar or Shemar is a given name. Notable people with the name include:

Shamar

- Shamar Bailey (born 1982), American martial artist
- Shamar Joseph (born 1999), Guyana and West Indies cricket player
- Shamar Nicholson (born 1997), Jamaican footballer
- Shamar Sands (born 1985), Bahamian track and field athlete
- Shamar Springer (born 1997), Barbadian cricketer
- Shamar Stephen (born 1991), American football player

Shemar

- Shemar Bartholomew (born 2000), American football player
- Shemar James (born 2004), American football player
- Shemar Jean-Charles (born 1998), American football player
- Shemar Moore (born 1970), American actor
- Shemar Stewart (born 2003), American football player
- Shemar Turner (born 2003), American football player

== See also ==
- Shamarh Brooks (born 1998), West Indian cricketer
