= Muriel Lanchester =

British puppeteer

- Muriel Lanchester, from a 1939 newspaper article
- Born: Gertrude Muriel Bell; 28 October 1901; Whalley Range, Manchester, England
- Died: 11 October 1992 (aged 90); Malvern, Worcestershire, England
- Other name: Gertrude M Lanchester
- Occupations: Ceramicist; Puppeteer
- Spouse: Waldo Lanchester
- Relatives: Elsa Lanchester, (Sister-in-Law); Edith Lanchester (Mother-in-Law)

Muriel Lanchester (28 October 1902 - 11 October 1992) was a British ceramicist and co-founder of the puppet theatre company, the Lanchester Marionettes. Lanchester and her husband, Waldo were the first British people to appear on French television, as part of the World's Fair in Paris in 1937. George Bernard Shaw’s final play, Shakes versus Shav, was written for the Lanchester Marionettes in 1949.

== Personal life ==
Gertrude Muriel Bell was born to parents Thomas Pool Bell (1845-1920) and Gertrude Ann, née Reston (1872-1958). By 1911 she had moved to Cheshire and by 1921 she was living in Colwyn Bay. She moved to Malvern in 1932 to establish a ceramics studio. In 1934 she met puppeteer Waldo Lanchester (1897-1978) while he was looking for a site to set up his puppet theatre for the Malvern Festival. They married in London in July 1935 and lived at Foley House, Malvern until 1951 when they moved to Stratford-upon-Avon. After retiring in 1969 they moved to Wilmcote. After Waldo died she returned to Malvern and lived at the Davenham Retirement Home until her death.

== Ceramicist ==
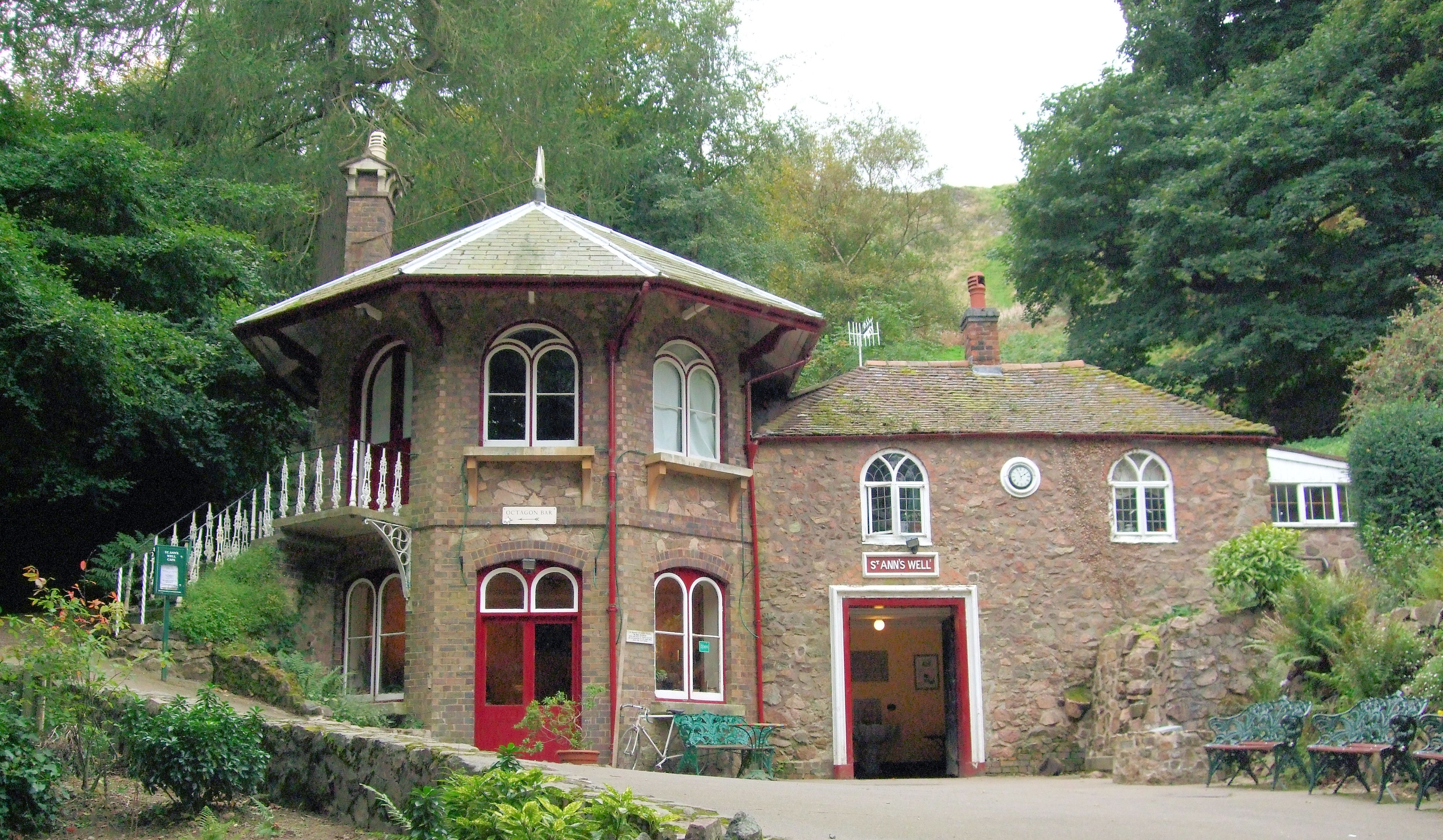
St. Ann’s Well, Malvern

Lanchester became interested in pottery after visiting an exhibition in Canada in 1927. Upon her return to England, she attended the Royal College of Art in Kensington, subsequently becoming a “star pupil” of the “father of British studio pottery”, Bernard Leach, working at Leach Pottery from 1930 to 1931. While there she taught Leach's son, David, how to throw pots. In 1932, she established St. Anne's Pottery at St. Ann's Well, Malvern, making utility stoneware articles. The pottery was in a converted 600-year-old stable that had once housed a kiln used by monks in the 15th century. She lectured at the Malvern School of Art and took on occasional apprentices, including May Davis (1914-1995).

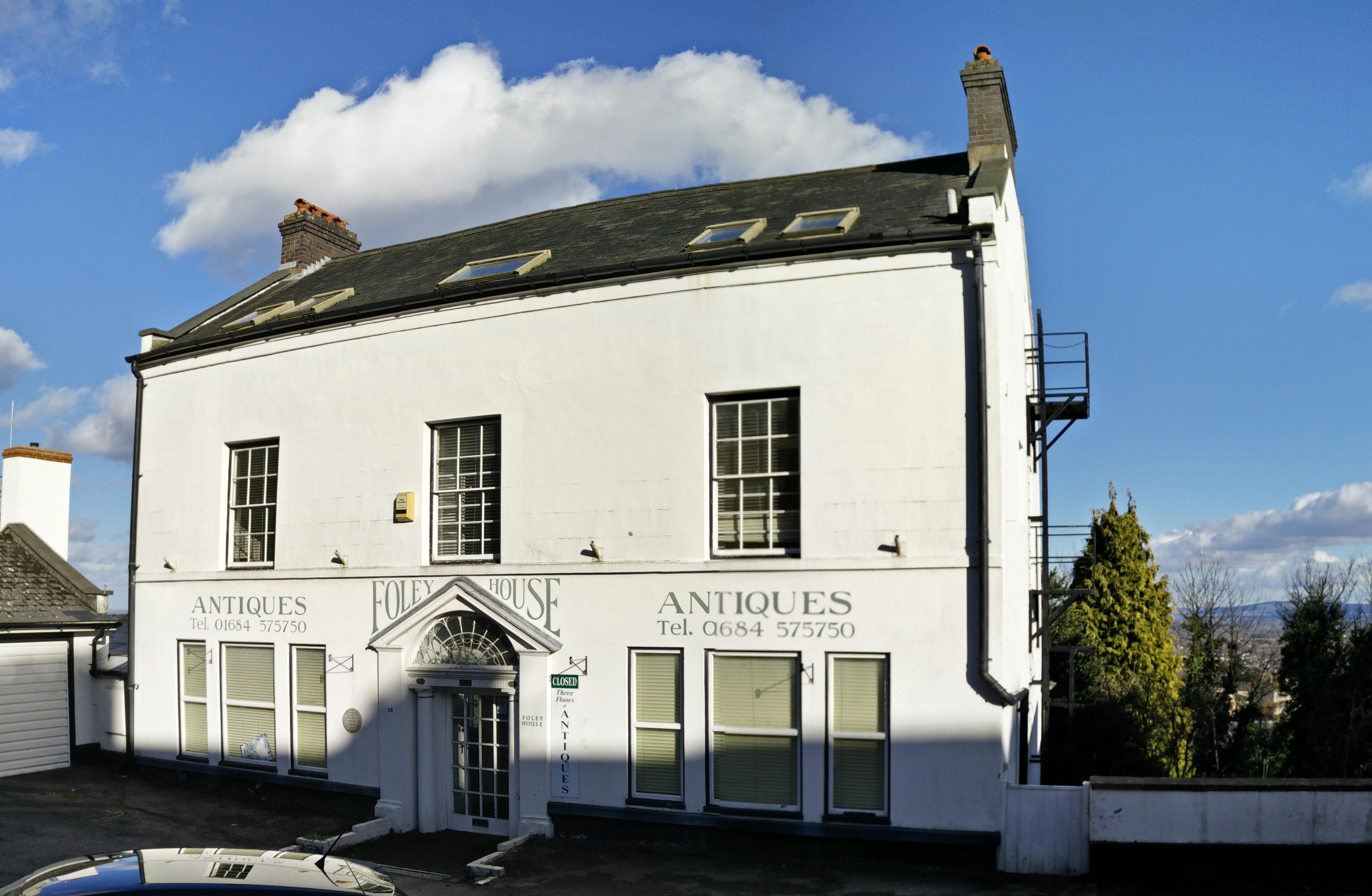
Foley House, Malvern

In 1935 she exhibited her wares at the Red Rose Guild of Artworkers’ exhibition in Manchester, which, at the time, ranked of “first importance in the minds of all craft workers”. By 1940 she was using one of the large rooms in Foley House, the home she shared with Waldo, as a pottery studio and shop.

== The Lanchester Marionettes ==
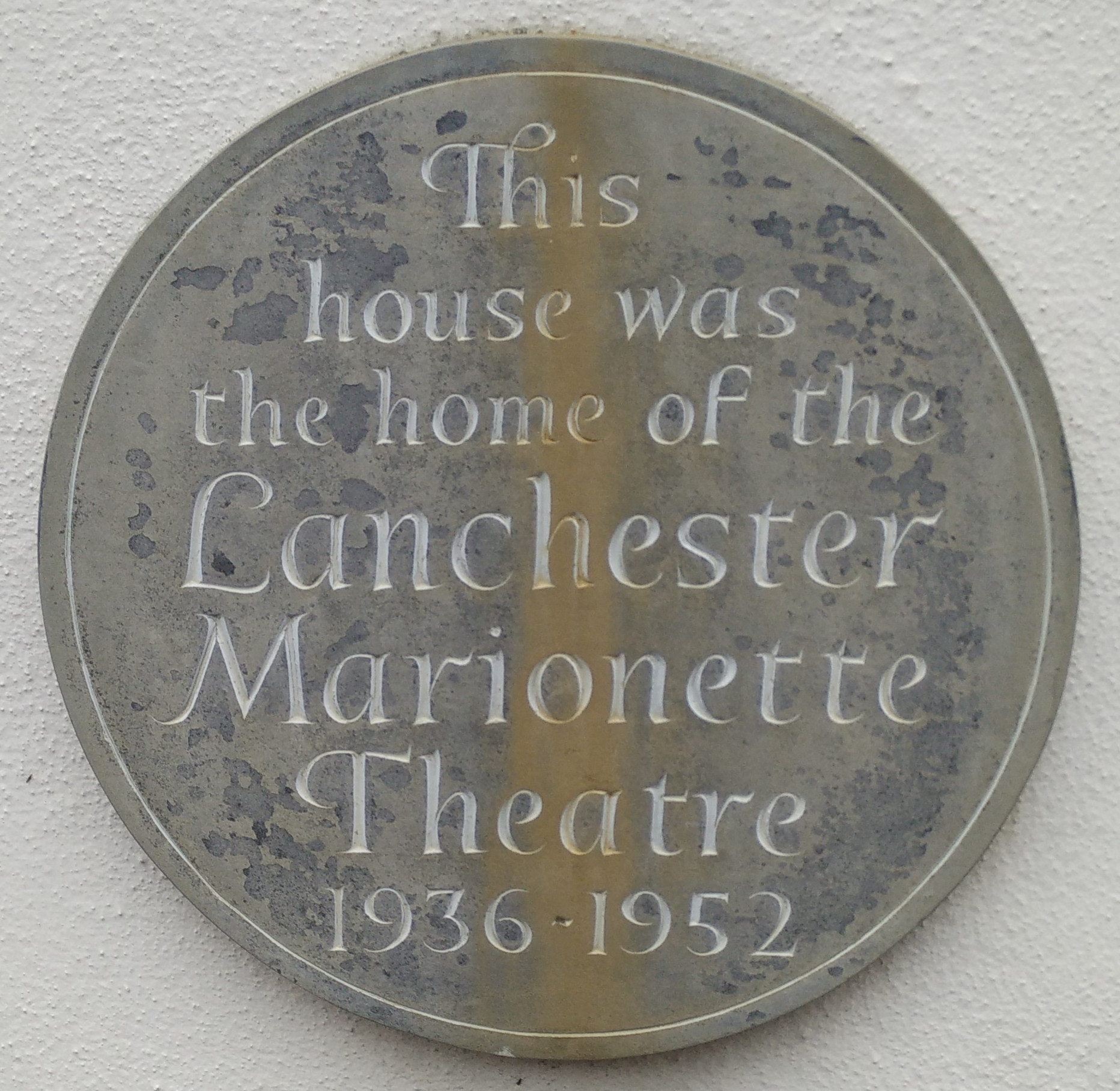
The plaque outside Foley House, Malvern

Lanchester and Waldo were interested in the early 20th century puppet revival, pioneered by Harry Whanslaw, who Waldo had worked with in the 1920s as part of the London Marionette Theatre. They established the 50-seat Lanchester Marionettes Theatre at Foley House, “the only theatre in the country exclusively to be used for marionettes.” It was opened on 24 July 1936 by Sir Barry Jackson, with George Bernard Shaw in the audience. Waldo created the puppets, Lanchester the costumes and both would work the puppets.

=== WWII ===
As part of the Entertainments National Service Association (ENSA) (and subsequently CEMA) the Lanchesters ran a touring puppet show that travelled 40,000 miles giving c. 700 performances throughout the UK. They appeared in factories, military camps and industrial workers’ hostels, as well as putting on performances for evacuees. When the Lanchesters initially offered their services, they were refused on the grounds that “the men wouldn’t want to watch Punch and Judy.” However, after almost two years ENSA realised the Lanchester Marionettes “bore no resemblance to seaside puppets” and were accepted.

=== Productions ===
Their best-known show was Shakes versus Shav, written by George Bernard Shaw, which premiered at Malvern's Lyttelton Hall on 9 August 1949. It was described as “a rumbustious knock-about farce” by Eric Walter White, of the Arts Council of Great Britain, who had “a minor reputation for being knowledgeable about puppetry”. The cast was Shaw, Shakespeare, Macbeth, Rob Roy, Captain Shotover and Ellie Dunn. Lanchester made all the costumes, seeking advice from Scotland regarding the correct tartan for the two Scottish characters.

Other notable productions included:

- Under-water ballet (1937) at the Paris Exhibition
- A performance for King George VI and the royal family at Buckingham Palace (1938)
- L'Amfiparnaso (1946)
- Philemon and Baucis (1952)
- A Trip to Bath (1958) with words and music by Flanders and Swann
- The Man, the Fish and the Spirit
- Paderewski at the Piano

In 1945 they were “taken bodily up to London” to appear in the film The Seventh Veil, starring Ann Todd and Hugh McDemott.

=== From 1951 onwards ===
In 1951 they moved to Stratford-upon-Avon, where they opened a Puppet Centre opposite the birthplace of Shakespeare. They sold puppets and also housed a “permanent exhibition of English & foreign puppets.” By 1952 they had “clocked up 100,000 miles” of travel around Great Britain.

In 1955 they made the film Magic Strings, directed by John R F Stewart. During the 1960s they produced smaller-scale productions, staged exhibitions and gave lecture-demonstrations. In 1972 Lanchester and Waldo were elected as Honorary Members of the International Puppetry Association, UNIMA.

In 2006 their collection of over 40 marionettes, sets and props was bought by the British Puppet and Model Theatre Guild, through a National Lottery grant. It is kept in Bridgnorth, Shropshire.

== See also ==
- Fisher, Douglas Wooden Stars: The Lanchester Marionettes (London; 1947) pub. TV Boardman Ltd
