= Lanchester Marionettes =

British puppet theatre

- Address: Malvern, Worcestershire; England
- Owner: Waldo Lanchester and Muriel Lanchester
- Type: Puppet
- Production: Shakes versus Shav

Construction
- Opened: 1936
- Years active: 1936–1969

The Lanchester Marionettes, a professional puppet theatre, was co-founded in 1936 by Waldo and Muriel Lanchester. The 50-seat Lanchester Marionettes Theatre in Malvern, Worcestershire, England was “the only theatre in the country exclusively to be used for marionettes.” George Bernard Shaw’s final play, Shakes versus Shav, was written for the Lanchester Marionettes in 1949.

== History ==
In 1934 puppeteer Waldo Lanchester (1897-1978) met potter Muriel Bell (1902-1992) while he was looking for a site to set up his puppet theatre for the Malvern Festival. They married a year later.

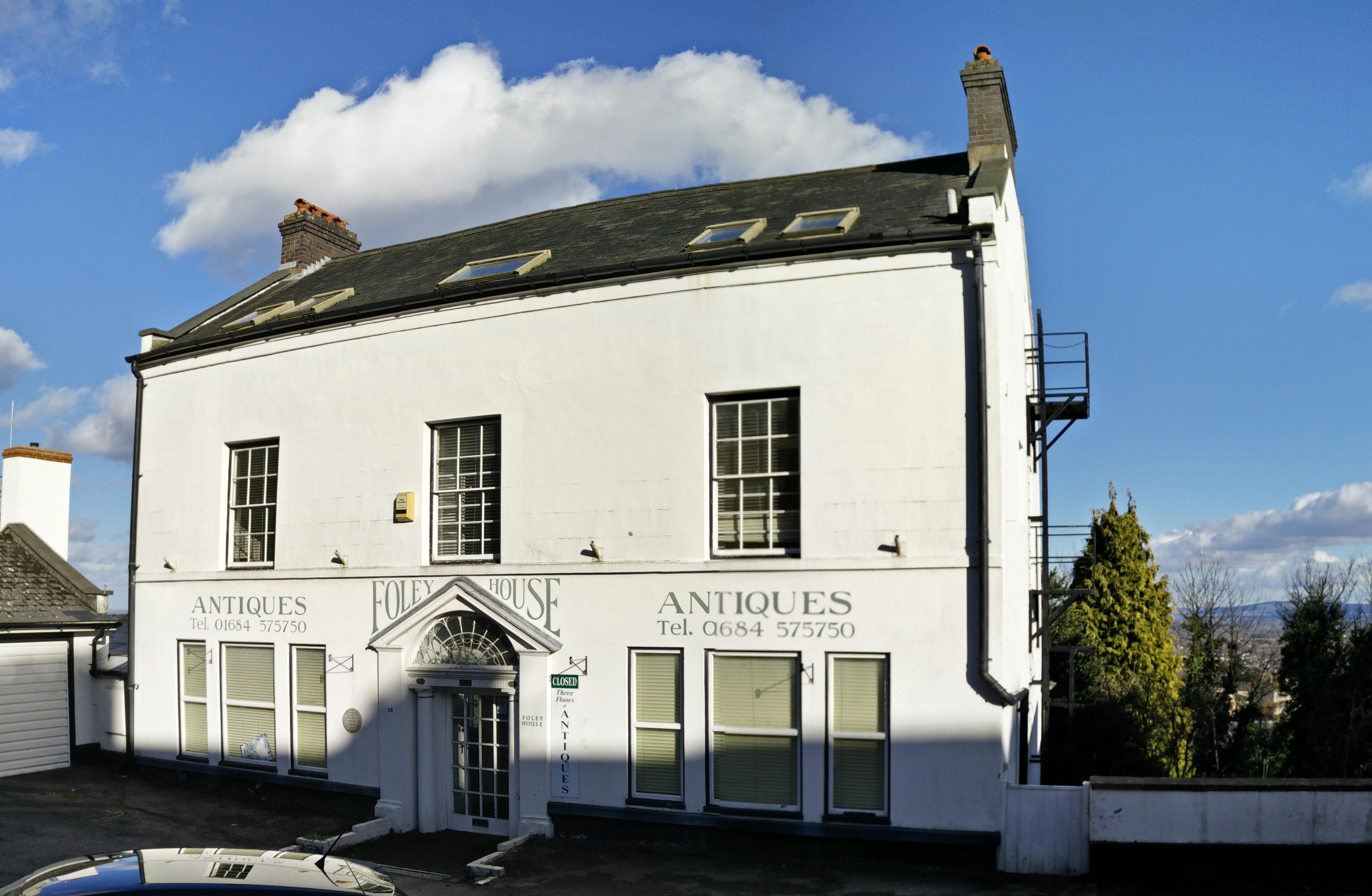
Foley House, Malvern. The location of the Lanchester Marionettes Theatre from 1936-1952

They were interested in the early 20th century puppet revival, pioneered by Harry Whanslaw, with whom Waldo had worked in the 1920s as part of the London Marionette Theatre. On 24 July 1936 the couple established the 50-seat Lanchester Marionettes Theatre at Foley House, it was “the only theatre in the country exclusively to be used for marionettes.” It was opened by Sir Barry Jackson, with George Bernard Shaw in the audience. Waldo created the puppets, Lanchester the costumes and both would work the puppets. They would put on three shows a day as part of the Malvern Drama Festival. Before WWII they also performed in “many foreign parts”. The Lanchester Marionettes were the first Britons to appear on French television, as part of the World’s Fair in Paris in 1937.

=== WWII ===
In 1938 Douglas Fisher, who was working at Malvern’s secret RAF radar base, “managed to scrounge some scarce 16mm Kodachrome colour stock” and shot a film, The Creation of a Marionette, about the Lanchester Marionettes. In 1947 he published a book, The Wooden Stars: The Lanchester Marionettes, and in 1985 he made a follow-up documentary, Waldo and Muriel Lanchester’s Marionette Masterclass.

As part of the Entertainments National Service Association(ENSA) (subsequently CEMA) the Lanchesters ran a touring puppet show that travelled 40,000 miles giving some 700 performances throughout the UK. They appeared in factories, military camps and industrial workers’ hostels, as well as putting on performances for evacuees. When the Lanchesters initially offered their services to ENSA, they were refused on the grounds that “the men wouldn’t want to watch Punch and Judy.” However, after almost two years ENSA realised the Lanchester Marionettes “bore no resemblance to seaside puppets” and they were accepted. Of a performance they gave in Wilmslow in October 1940, one reporter wrote “It was refreshing to sit for two hours in a world without dictators or bombs, but in which the foibles of life were etched with such understanding and without malice.”

=== Productions ===
Their puppet shows covered opera, ballet, theatre and circus. In 1937 their under-water ballet featured at the Paris Exhibition. The following year they were invited to perform for King George VI and the royal family at Buckingham Palace.

Their most famous production was Shakes versus Shav, written for them by George Bernard Shaw. The puppet cast was Shaw, Shakespeare, Macbeth, Rob Roy, Captain Shotover and Ellie Dunn, the latter two characters from Shaw’s Heartbreak House (1919). The voice recordings included Lewis Casson as Shakes (Shakespeare) and Ernest Thesiger as Shav (Bernard Shaw). Lanchester made all the costumes, seeking advice from Scotland regarding the correct tartan for Macbeth and Rob Roy. The Shaw puppet is now housed at the George Bernard Shaw Museum and the Shakespeare puppet is owned by the Shakespeare Birthplace Trust. The others are in the Staffordshire County Museum.

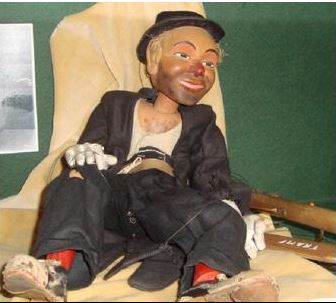
The Tramp Clown marionette made by Waldo and Muriel Lanchester

Other productions included:

- The Turnip-Hoeing (1936)
- The Crow and the Skeleton (1936)
- The Clown and the Butterfly (1936)
- The Sacred Cat (1938)
- The Farmer’s Dream (1939)
- The Grenadiers (1939)
- L'Amfiparnaso (1946), a madrigal opera premiered at the Wigmore Hall together with the New English Singers and broadcast by the BBC.
- Philemon and Baucis (1952)
- The Magic Box (1953)
- A Trip to Bath (1958), a musical for the Bath Festival with words and music by Flanders and Swann and spoken word by Mark Dignam
- The Grand Circus
- Old Time Marionettes
- The Man, the Fish and the Spirit
- Peter and the Wolf
- This Circus
- Paderewski at the Piano

After WWII the Marionettes received financial support from the Arts Council. In 1945 they were “taken bodily up to London” to appear in the film The Seventh Veil, starring Ann Todd and Hugh McDemott.

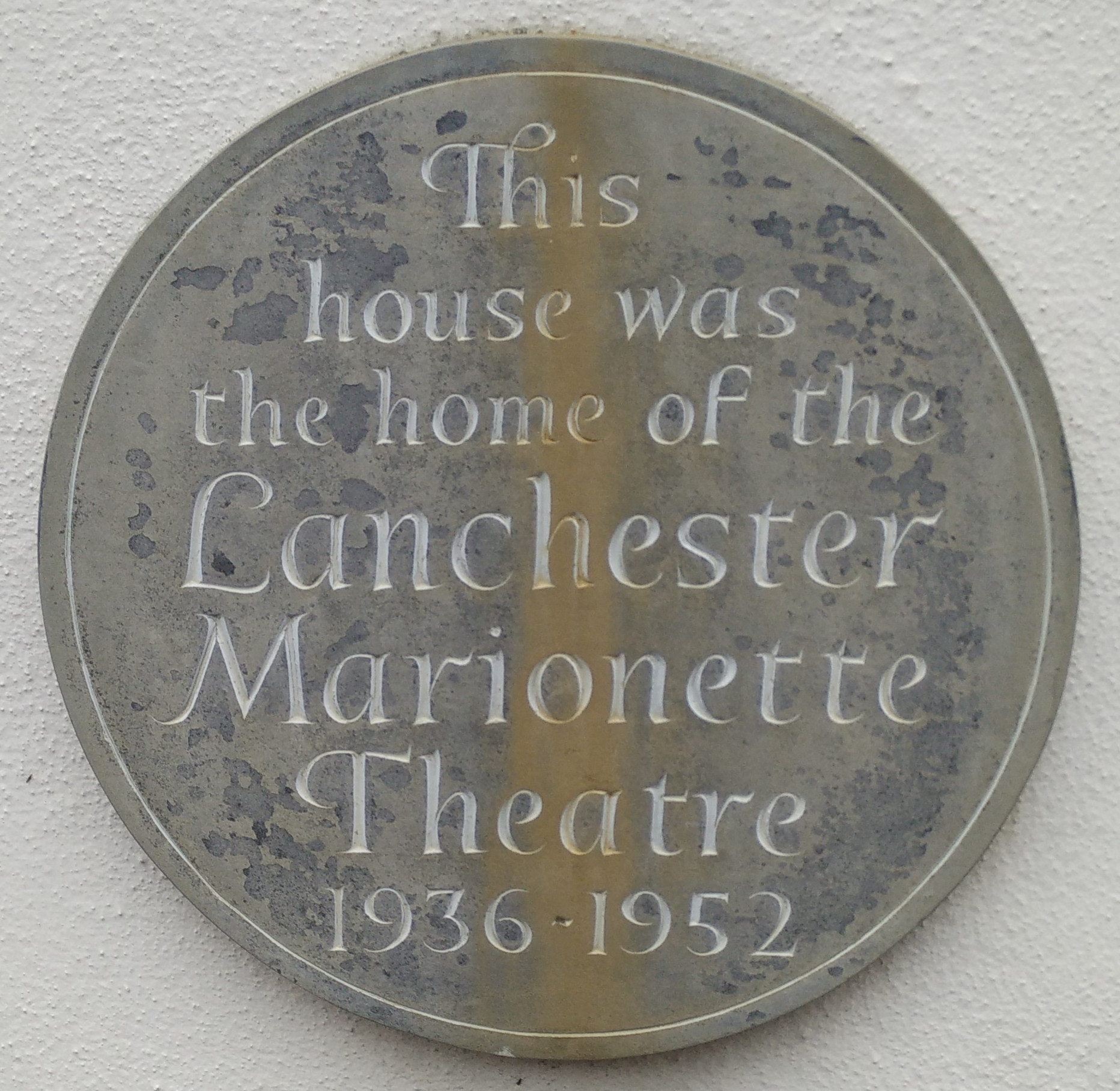
The plaque outside Foley House, Malvern

In 1946 their Foley House theatre became too small and was closed with the hope that a new, larger venue could be found. They would tour for the following five years, and by 1952 they had “clocked up 100,000 miles” of travel around Great Britain. In 1949 they appeared at the British Theatre Exhibition in Birmingham

=== From 1951 onwards ===
In 1951 they moved to Stratford-upon-Avon, where they opened a Puppet Centre opposite the birthplace of Shakespeare. They also sold puppets, including Lanchester-Lee marionettes in kit form, made from easy-to-carve “Leetex”, a material developed by Waldo and John Lee. The shop also housed a “permanent exhibition of English & foreign puppets.”

As part of the Festival of Britain in 1951 they performed at the Marlowe Theatre, Bath Assembly Rooms and Wigmore Hall.

In 1955 they made the film Magic Strings, directed by John R F Stewart. It was featured on a “number of ocean liners, and the British Council purchased 15 copies for their overseas centres.” During the 1960s they created maller-scale productions, staged exhibitions and gave lecture-demonstrations, retiring in 1969. In 1972 the couple were elected as Honorary Members of the International Puppetry Association, UNIMA.

In the 1980s their collection of 3,000 marionettes, sets and props was donated to the British Toymaker’s Guild headquarters at the Polka Theatre in Wimbledon. In 2006 a selection of some 40 items was bought by the British Puppet and Model Theatre Guild, through a National Lottery grant. It is kept in Bridgnorth, Shropshire.

== See also ==
- Fisher, Douglas Wooden Stars: The Lanchester Marionettes (London; 1947) pub. TV Boardman Ltd
