= Landscape with Philemon and Baucis =

1620 painting by Peter Paul Rubens

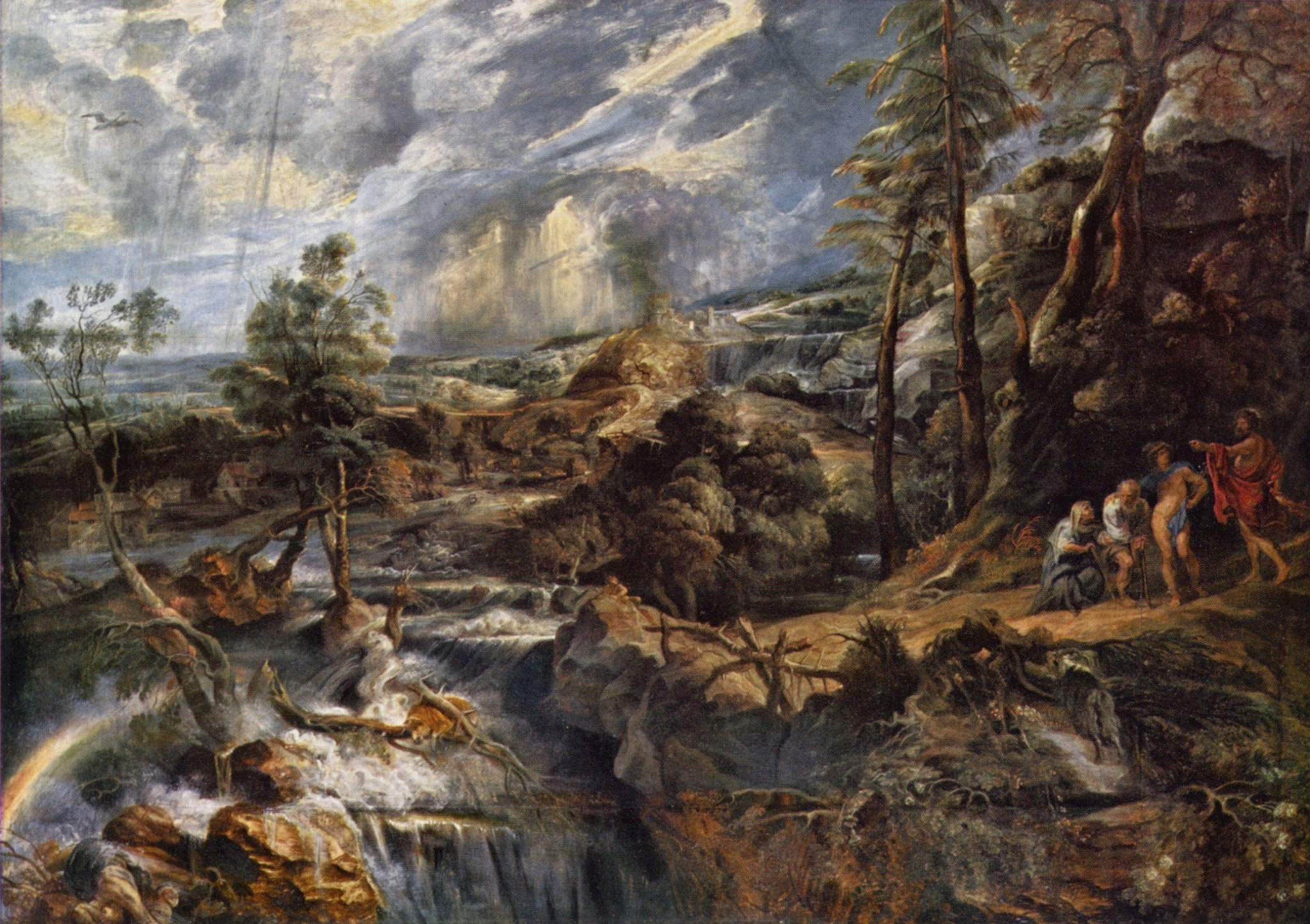
Landscape with Philemon and Baucis (1620) by Rubens

Landscape with Philemon and Baucis is a 1620 painting by Flemish artist Peter Paul Rubens. It is centred on the myth of Baucis and Philemon. The painting is now located in the Kunsthistorisches Museum in Vienna.

== Bibliography ==
- Hermann Bauer: El Barroco en los Países Bajos, en Los maestros de la pintura occidental, Taschen, 2005, p. 290, ISBN 3-8228-4744-5
