= Ghostwood =

- Directed by: Justin O'Brien
- Written by: Justin O'Brien
- Produced by: Tom Higgins
- Starring: Patrick Bergin; Shane Connaughton; Alan Devine; Eugene Horan; Louise Osbourne; Donal Patterson; Robert Sheehan; Mark Stewart
- Distributed by: Maxim Pictures; NonStop Sales AB (worldwide)
- Release date: 2006
- Running time: 85 minutes
- Country: Ireland
- Language: English

Ghostwood is a 2006 supernatural thriller film directed by Justin O'Brien and produced by Ned Dowd. Executive Producers were Mairead Killian, Tom Higgins, John Slazenger and Noel Lourdes.

== Plot ==
Driven to investigate the unexplained disappearance of his father, New York psychologist Ed Hunter (Alan Devine) travels to a remote village in the west of Ireland and finds a community that has been living in fear for centuries.

He meets a mysterious girl (Louise Osbourne) who tells him that his father had been searching for the spirits of a mother and child who were buried alive in the nearby forest over 1000 years ago because his ancestors had killed them. His father wanted to pay the debt and asked his friend, the local parish priest (Patrick Bergin) who holds all the answers, but he soon finds that the priest has locked himself in his church for fear of his life. Later, the priest tells Ed that his father had taken a skull from the place where the mother and child were buried alive and that the spirits want it back. Ed decides to return it with the help of priest. When he enter the chambers to place the skull back, he finds a dead body of the real priest and realizes the man posing as priest is his real father. He realizes that his father has trapped him in the chambers alive just like the mother and son to pay the debt. Later, his dad is also killed by the spirits. Last scene shows that Ed's girlfriend is pregnant and spirit is watching over.

== Cast ==
- Patrick Bergin
- Shane Connaughton
- Alan Devine - Ed Hunter
- Eugene Horan
- Louise Osbourne
- Donal Patterson
- Robert Sheehan
- Mark Stewart
- Charley Rutledge
