= Shakes versus Shav =

Puppet play by George Bernard Shaw

- Lanchester's 1953 published version, depicting the Shakespeare and Shaw puppets
- Written by: George Bernard Shaw
- Characters: George Bernard Shaw; William Shakespeare
- Subject: Shakespeare and Shaw bicker about who is the better writer
- Genre: Puppet

Premiere
- Date: August 9, 1949
- Place: Lyceum Hall, Malvern

Shakes versus Shav (1949) is a puppet play written by George Bernard Shaw. It was Shaw's last completed dramatic work. The play runs for 10 minutes in performance and comprises a comic argument between Shaw and Shakespeare, with the two playwrights bickering about who is the better writer as a form of intellectual equivalent of Punch and Judy.

== Origin ==
The play was written by Shaw for the Lanchester Marionettes who were based in their own theatre in Foley House, Malvern, Worcestershire, England. The company's founders, Waldo and Muriel Lanchester, performed regularly in the Malvern Festival. Shaw, having seen their performances over the years, wrote Shakes versus Shav for the company in 1949. The play was the last expression of Shaw's long-standing "debate" with Shakespeare and critique of what he called bardolatry. He had earlier portrayed Shakespeare in his skit The Dark Lady of the Sonnets.

Archibald Henderson points out that the play draws on a long tradition of satirical sketches comparing Shaw to Shakespeare, dating back to 1905, when a play by J. B. Fagan with the very similar title Shakespeare vs. Shaw was produced at the Haymarket Theatre. This sketch was in the form of a court case in which Shakespeare sues Shaw following a lecture Shaw had given earlier in the year in which he had said that Shakespeare was a "narrow minded middle class man" with "no religion, no politics, no great concerns". Shaw often participated in these skits, by lending costumes, or even writing dialogue for one entitled His Wild Oat (1926). The ghosts of Shakespeare and Shaw also appear in Back to G.B.S.; or A Midsummer Nightmare (1932), a fantasia set in the year 2156, when the two playwrights have become confused with each other. Another, Bernard Shaw Arrives: A Fantasy in One Act was a parody of Don Juan in Hell in which Shaw, Shakespeare and Mephistopheles engage in a debate.

== Characters ==
- William Shakespeare
- George Bernard Shaw
- Macbeth
- Rob Roy
- Captain Shotover
- Miss Ellie Dunn

== Plot summary ==
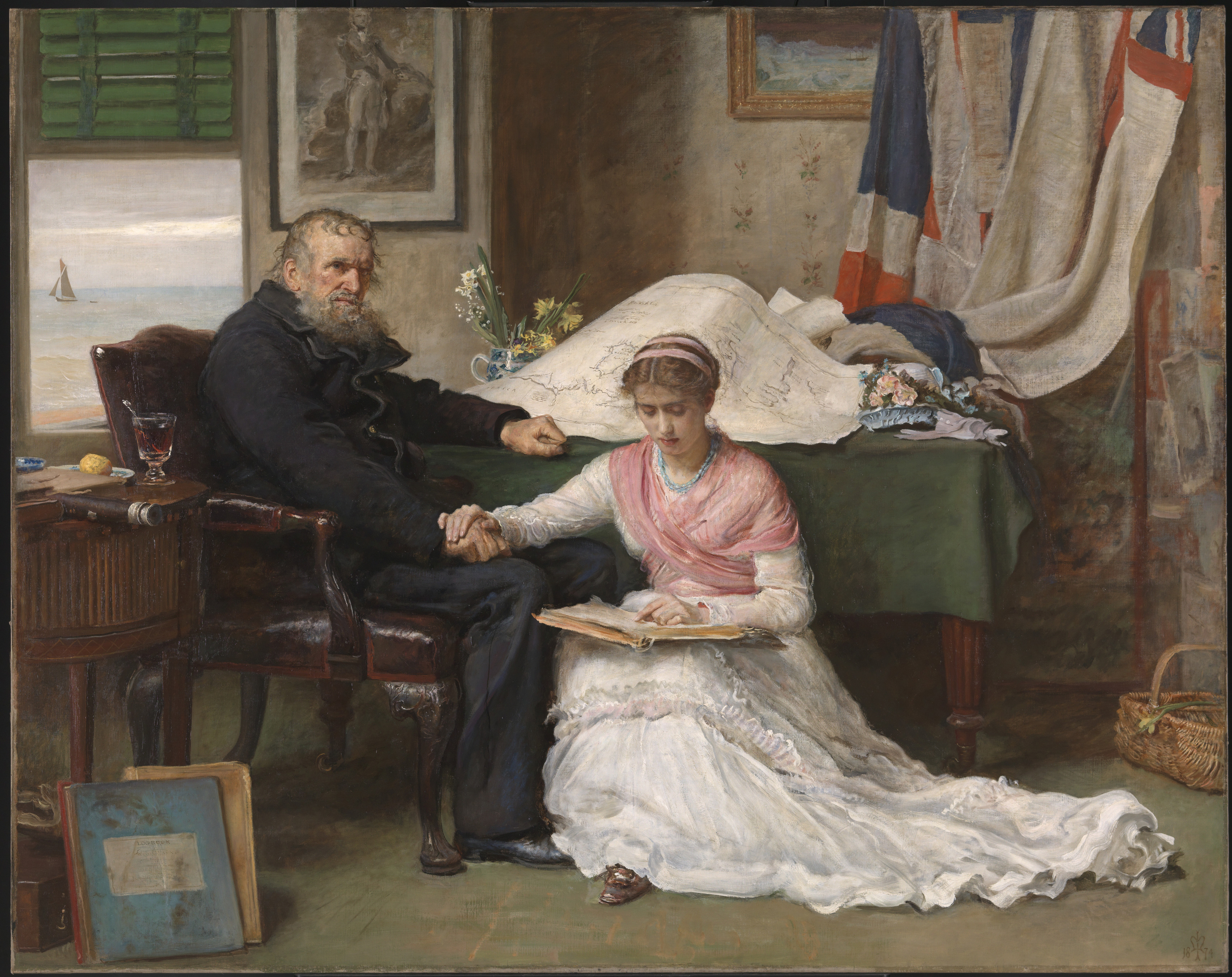
Millais' The North-West Passage

William Shakespeare arrives in Malvern, seeking the upstart Shaw, quoting lines from his own plays. Shaw appears and Shakespeare punches him to the ground. He starts to count him out, but Shaw leaps up and punches Shakespeare to the ground. Shakespeare bounds back too. They start to argue. Shaw claims that Macbeth has been bettered by Scott's novel Rob Roy, and "proves" the point by staging a fight between the ghosts of the two Scots, which Rob Roy wins.

Shaw then asserts that Adam Lindsay Gordon has outdone Shakespeare's verse, quoting the lines "The beetle booms adown the glooms/And bumps among the clumps" (in fact a garbled version of lines by James Whitcomb Riley). Shakespeare laughs at this. He tells Shaw that he could never have written Hamlet or King Lear. Shaw replies that Shakespeare could not have written Heartbreak House, and creates a pastiche of his own play with the characters posed in imitation of John Everett Millais' painting The North-West Passage.

Shakespeare defends the emotional power of his work. Shaw defends the practical value of his. Shaw ends by quoting Shakespeare's own words and bringing into being a small light to symbolise his own reputation. Shakespeare puts out the light and the play ends.

== Puppets ==
Waldo Lanchester carved the six marionettes (heads were carved by Jack Whitehead) and Muriel costumed them, having sought advice from Scotland on the correct tartans for Macbeth and Rob Roy. The Shaw puppet is now housed in the George Bernard Shaw Museum, Shaw's Corner, at Ayot St Lawrence, the Shakespeare puppet is in the Shakespeare Birthplace Trust and the other four puppets – Macbeth, Rob Roy, Captain Shotover and Ellie Dunn – are in the Staffordshire County Museum at Shugborough Hall.

== Productions ==
In the original production the dialogue was pre-recorded by actors, and broadcast during the performance. The Lanchesters had to synchronise the puppetry with the recording. Lewis Casson voiced Shakespeare, and Ernest Thesiger was Shaw. Russell Thorndike and Archie Duncan voiced Macbeth and Rob Roy respectively. Cecil Trouncer and Isabel Dean voiced Shotover and Ellie.

In 2007, the play was revived by Henry Bell at the Orange Tree Theatre with Dudley Hinton and John Paul Connelly playing the two principal parts written for puppets. John Thaxter of The Stage described the production as "history making".
