= Alan Devine =

Irish actor (born 1970)

- Born: 1970 (age 55–56); County Galway, Ireland
- Occupation: Actor

Alan Devine (born 1970) is an Irish actor. His television credits include Glenroe, Fair City, Vikings and Vikings: Valhalla, and the films Frankie Starlight, Veronica Guerin and Ghostwood.

== Early life and education ==
Devine was born in County Galway in 1970. Devine graduated with honours from Trinity College Dublin, where he studied philosophy and sociology. He has since pursued a career of acting in both film and on stage. His credits include numerous stage roles, including various works of Shakespeare.

== Career ==
Devine appeared in the rural drama Glenroe during the 1990s as Ray O'Driscoll, who fled the country after he killed his brother Oliver in 1999. This storyline was one of the biggest the show had in the 1990s.

His film roles include portraying the Irish criminal Gerry “The Monk” Hutch in the movie Veronica Guerin. He has received credit for work in several other films and television shows, including King Arthur, Nora, Ghostwood (where he played the lead), The Tudors, Vikings, and The Gift.

Devine appeared in TV commercials for Guinness, playing the part of Tom Crean, the legendary Arctic explorer from County Kerry.

He subsequently appeared in the Irish soap opera Fair City as Louie Gleeson. In 2010, Devine appeared on stage in the play My First Time alongside Leigh Arnold, Alan Shortt, and Claire Tully in different venues across Ireland. He played the Earl of Kent in the Netflix series Vikings: Valhalla.

== Filmography ==
- Frankie Starlight (1995)
- Angela Mooney (1996)
- Miracle at Midnight (1998)
- Home (short) (1998)
- Flick (2000)
- Blatant Disregard (2000)
- Nora (2000)
- The Honourable Scaffolder (2003)
- Veronica Guerin (2003)
- King Arthur (2004)
- An Teanga Runda (2005)
- Ghostwood (2006)
- Fair City (2008–2012)
- The Tudors (2014)
- Vikings (2016)
- The Gift (2017)
- Vikings: Valhalla (2022)
