= Bel's Boys (TV series) =

British television series

Bel's Boys is a British children's television series based on the band of the same name. The show had 26 episodes over two series. It first aired on ITV in 2006 and later repeated on CITV.

The series was produced by Initial (part of the Endemol group) and was part funded by the NIFTC (Northern Ireland Film and Television Commission). The series was filmed entirely in Belfast making it the biggest drama series ever to be filmed in Northern Ireland.

== Overview ==
The programme centres around the band, Bel's Boys, and their 9-year-old manager, Bel. Band members Vince, Leon and Tay send their demo CD to a manager, Ainsley Barter. However, being a manager for acting, not a band manager, he tosses it in the bin. His 9-year-old daughter, Bel, listens to it and is instantly a fan. Bel goes to the garage where the band practice and hang out. Although they are uncertain at first about having a 9-year-old being their manager, she convinces them that the only way for them to get noticed by her father for her to first become their manager. They often enlist the help of Ainsley's assistant, SJ, her younger brother, Ollie, as well as Bel's best friend, Carina, although her friendship with Bel is often strained by her commitment to the band.

== Cast ==
- Vince - Graham McKee
- Leon - Luke O'Reilly
- Tay - Eoin Logan
- Bel Barter - Allanah Scully
- SJ - Dorothy Cotter
- Ollie - Leo McGuigan
- Carina - Lara McIvor
- Ainsley Barter - Paddy Jenkins
- Max - Robert Sheehan
