= Bel's Boys =

Irish pop/rock band

- Origin: Belfast, Northern Ireland
- Genre: Pop rock
- Years active: 2006–2007
- Label: Universal Music
- Members: Graham McKee; Luke O'Reilly; Eoin Logan

Bel's Boys was a pop/rock band based in Belfast, Northern Ireland. The band is known for starring in the children's television programme Bel's Boys on ITV.

== The band ==
The three members of the band are Graham McKee (lead vocals/bass guitar) as Vince, Luke O'Reilly (lead guitar/vocals) as Leon and Eoin Logan (drums/vocals) as Tay. Their sound is similar to that of acts such as The Monkees, McFly and Led Zeppelin. They came together in the early 2006 to begin work on their debut album, People Let's Go, and to film the first part of their television series. They were signed to Universal Music, and the album was released in April 2007. An exclusive download-only release of "Can't Go There Again" was made available on 3 November 2007.

They performed at primary schools, culminating in a main-stage performance at the 21st World Scout Jamboree. This was the height of the band's success, and they went their separate ways in 2007; however, their fans hope for a reunion. The media has quashed speculation so far, but in late 2011, Eoin Logan (who was 28 when filming for the show began) was quoted as saying, "I would welcome a return to the band and would love to reprise my role of Tay again. I feel that the character still has a lot of potential and I have a few ideas on how I would like to develop him. A part of me will always be Tay".

Eoin went on to study for a History and Theatre Studies degree at the University of Glasgow.

== The programme ==
Bel's Boys was made by Initial (part of the Endemol group) and was partially funded by the NIFTC (Northern Ireland Film and Television Commission). The series was filmed entirely in Belfast.

On the CITV television programme, Graham as Vince, Luke as Leon and Eoin as Tay play the starring roles. The show follows the band's progress as they try to reach the top. It begins with the band being rejected by a talent agent, only to have his nine-year-old daughter, Bel Barter, played by Allanah Scully, take on the role of the band's manager.

== Discography ==
=== Albums ===
People Let's Go

Studio album by Bel's Boys
- Released: 23 April 2007
- Recorded: 2006–2007
- Genre: Pop
- Label: Universal

Singles from People Let's Go
- 1. "Today's the Day" Released: 16 April 2007

- 2007: People Let's Go

Track listing:

1. "Today's the Day" - (Phil Thornalley)
2. "People Let's Go" - (B Mackichan / S Ellis)
3. "Hold Me Close" - (David Essex)
4. "She's Alright" - (Phil Thornalley)
5. "Can't Go There Again" - (Dave Munday / C Josias)
6. "Reaching Out" - (A Griffiths / T Griffiths / C Griffiths / T Martin)
7. "I Think We're Alone Now" - (R Cordell)
8. "Calendar Girl" - (Boo Hewerdine / Phil Thornalley)
9. "Just Wanna Rock & Roll" - (F McDonald)
10. "Cry" - (B Rose / S Conlon)
11. "Monday's Dreaming" - (Phil Thornalley)
12. "She's Not There" - (Rod Argent)

=== Singles ===
- April 2007: "Today's the Day" (reached #84 in the UK Singles Chart. The song was originally a hit for Sean Maguire in 1997)
