= Malcolm Sinclair (actor) =

British actor (born 1950)

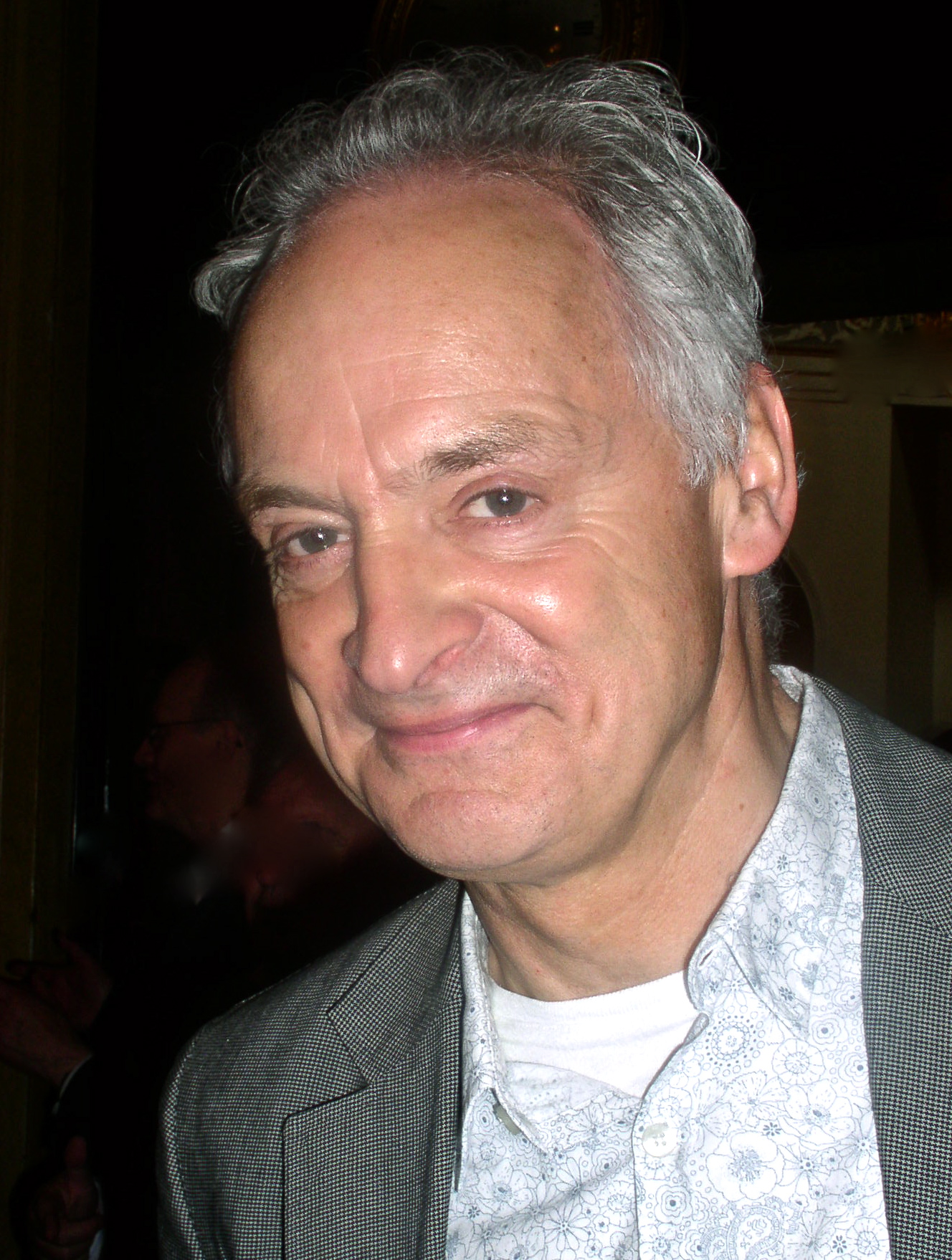
- Sinclair in 2011
- Born: 5 June 1950 (age 76); London, England
- Occupation: Actor
- Years active: 1984–present

Malcolm Sinclair (born 5 June 1950) is a British stage and television actor and former president of the actors' union, Equity. He played Assistant Chief Constable Freddy Fisher in the television series Pie in the Sky from 1994 to 1997.

Malcolm's brother is Keith Sinclair, the former Bishop of Birkenhead.

== Career ==
A former pupil at Trinity School in Croydon, and a student at the University of Hull and Bristol Old Vic Theatre School, Sinclair has performed with theatre companies such as the Royal National Theatre and Royal Shakespeare Company. He has performed widely, both in Britain and internationally, in roles that have included Shakespeare (Hamlet, Malvolio), Oscar Wilde, George Bernard Shaw, Ibsen and Noël Coward.

Sinclair appeared in the play Little Lies, starring Sir John Mills, at Wyndham's Theatre, London, England, which ran from July 1983 through February 1984, written by Joseph George Caruso and produced by Robert Mackintosh and William de Silva, and was directed by Tony Tanner. The play also starred Connie Booth, Anthony Bate, Dominic Guard, Paul Hardwick, Angela Scoular, Katherine Kath, Alison Neil and Gregory Cox. After the London production, the play transferred to the Royal Alexandra Theatre, Toronto, Canada, for a limited engagement of six weeks. This production was directed by Michael Attenborough.

In 2001 Sinclair won the Clarence Derwent Award for his role as Gavin Ryng-Maine in the Royal National Theatre's production of House/Garden. He was also nominated for an Olivier Award as best supporting actor for his performance as Major Miles Flack in Privates on Parade. Recently he has performed in a number of BBC Radio 4 dramatisations of the Agatha Raisin book series alongside Penelope Keith. Keith stars as Agatha, while Malcolm Sinclair portrays her neighbour James Lacey, who is also an object of Agatha's affection.

== Equity ==
In July 2010 Sinclair was elected president of Equity, the actors' and performance professionals' trade union. He was in the role for four terms, until 2018, when he stood down and was succeeded by Maureen Beattie.

== Act for Change Project ==
In January 2014, after responding to a trailer for a new season of TV drama which failed to include a single BAME artist, the actor Danny Lee Wynter brought together a group of friends and colleagues, Ruth Wilson, Stephanie Street, Daniel Evans, Andy Pryor, Malcolm Sinclair, Kobna Holdbrook-Smith, Ony Uhiara, and Matthew Xia, to find a way to inspire change in TV drama.

Together they wanted to send out the message that TV drama must reflect everyone regardless of race, gender, class, sexual orientation or disability. What started as a small handful of voices soon became the Act for Change project. In 2015 The Act For Change Project became a registered charity and in 2016, Malcolm Sinclair became an ambassador for the charity. Malcolm also serves as a Trustee of ACT, the Actors' Children's Trust, and Denville Hall, the actors' care home.

== Selected credits ==
Television credits include:

- Andor as Colonel Wullf Yularen (2022)
- Midsomer Murders in S18E5 “Saints and Sinners” as Rev Peter Corby (2016)
- Salting the Battlefield (2014)
- Foyle's War (2008)
- Midsomer Murders – in 'Shot at Dawn' as Johnny Hammond (2008)
- Daphne as Noël Coward (2007)
- Falling – as Anthony (2005)
- Rosemary & Thyme – in 'They Understand Me in Paris' as Quentin Glazer (2004)
- Murder Rooms – in 'The Patient's Eyes' as Blythe (2001)
- Victoria & Albert – as 'Lord Conyngham (2001)
- A&E – as Clive Thornton (2001)
- Anna Karenina as Prince Shcherbatsky (2000)
- Midsomer Murders – in 'Beyond the Grave' as Alan Bradford (2000)
- The Bill – in 'Tinderbox' as Geoffrey Levinson (1999)
- Kavanagh QC – in 'The More Loving One' as Giles Luckhurst (1999)
- Casualty – in 'Toys and Boys' as Mike Price (1998)
- Pie in the Sky – as ACC Freddy Fisher (1994–1997)
- A Touch of Frost – in 'Quarry' as Chief Constable (1995)
- The Scarlet and the Black – as Abbé Castanede (1993)
- Agatha Christie's Poirot – in 'The Mystery of the Spanish Chest' as Edward Clayton (1991)
- Hancock as John Le Mesurier (1991)
- Rumpole of the Bailey – in 'Rumpole and the Age of Miracles' as Peter Lambert (1988)
- The Prisoner of Zenda – as Rudolf Rassendyll / King Rudolf V (1984)

Film credits include:

- Casino Royale as Dryden (2006)
- V for Vendetta as Major Wilson (2005)
- Secret Passage (2004)
- The Statement as the Cardinal of Lyon (2003)
- The Young Poisoner's Handbook as Dr. Triefus (1995)
- Success Is the Best Revenge (1984)

Radio credits include:

- Mr Bridger's Orphan as Noël Coward (BBC Radio 4 15 March 2013)
- Our Man in Jamaica as Noël Coward (BBC Radio 4 2007)
- Death at the Desert Inn as Noël Coward (BBC Radio 4 11 December 2004)
- A Bullet at Balmain's as Noël Coward (BBC Radio 4 8 November 2003)
- Blithe Spy as Noël Coward (BBC Radio 4 2002)
- Design for Murder as Noël Coward (BBC Radio 4 8 January 2000)
- By Jeeves as Jeeves (BBC Radio 2 November 1996)

Stage credits include:

- Withnail and I as Uncle Monty (Birmingham Repertory Theatre)
- Pressure as Dwight D Eisenhower (Royal Lyceum Theatre / Chichester Festival Theatre)
- Rattigan's Nijinsky (Chichester Festival Theatre)
- Racing Demon as Lionel Espy (Crucible Theatre)
- The Habit of Art as Henry/Benjamin Britten (National Theatre)
- The Power of Yes as Scholes (National Theatre)
- Ivanov as Shabelsky (Donmar Warehouse at Wyndham's Theatre)
- Rosmersholm as Dr Kroll (Almeida Theatre)
- Dealer's Choice, as Stephen (Trafalgar Studios)
- The History Boys as the Headmaster (National Theatre and Broadway)
- Uncle Vanya as Serebryakov (Royal Shakespeare Company at the Young Vic)
- House/Garden as Gavin Ryng-Maine (Royal National Theatre) for which he won a Clarence Derwent Award in 2001
- My Fair Lady as Col Pickering (Theatre Royal, Drury Lane)
- Privates on Parade as 'Major Miles Flack' (Donmar Warehouse), for which he was nominated for an Olivier Award
- By Jeeves as Jeeves (Duke of York's Theatre)
- Heartbreak House as Mazzini Dunn (Almeida Theatre)
- Hay Fever as Richard Greatham (Tour and Savoy Theatre)
- Der Freischütz as Narrator (Barbican Concert Hall, London)
