= Withnail and I (play) =

2024 play

- Poster for the Birmingham production
- Written by: Bruce Robinson
- Based on: Withnail and I (1987 film) by Bruce Robinson
- Genre: Comedy
- Setting: London, 1969

Premiere
- Date: 3 May 2024
- Place: Birmingham Repertory Theatre

Withnail and I is a play by Bruce Robinson, based on the 1987 film of the same name also by Robinson.

== Production history ==
The play had its world premiere at the Birmingham Repertory Theatre beginning previews on 3 May, with an official press night on 14 May, running until 25 May 2024. The production is directed by Sean Foley and designed by Alice Power. On 18 March 2024, initial casting was announced including Robert Sheehan as Withnail, Adonis Siddique as And I (Marwood) and Malcolm Sinclair as Uncle Monty.

== Cast and characters ==
Character	Birmingham
Character	2024
Withnail	Robert Sheehan
And I (Marwood)	Adonis Siddique
Uncle Monty	Malcolm Sinclair
Danny	Adam Young
Presuming Ed	Israel J. Fredericks
W*nker/Jake the Poacher	Morgan Philpott
Farmer/Colonel & Band	Matt Devitt
Geezer/Policeman, Band & Musical Director	Adam Sopp
Miss Blenehassitt/Policewoman & Band	Sooz Kempner
