= The North-West Passage =

Painting by John Everet Millais

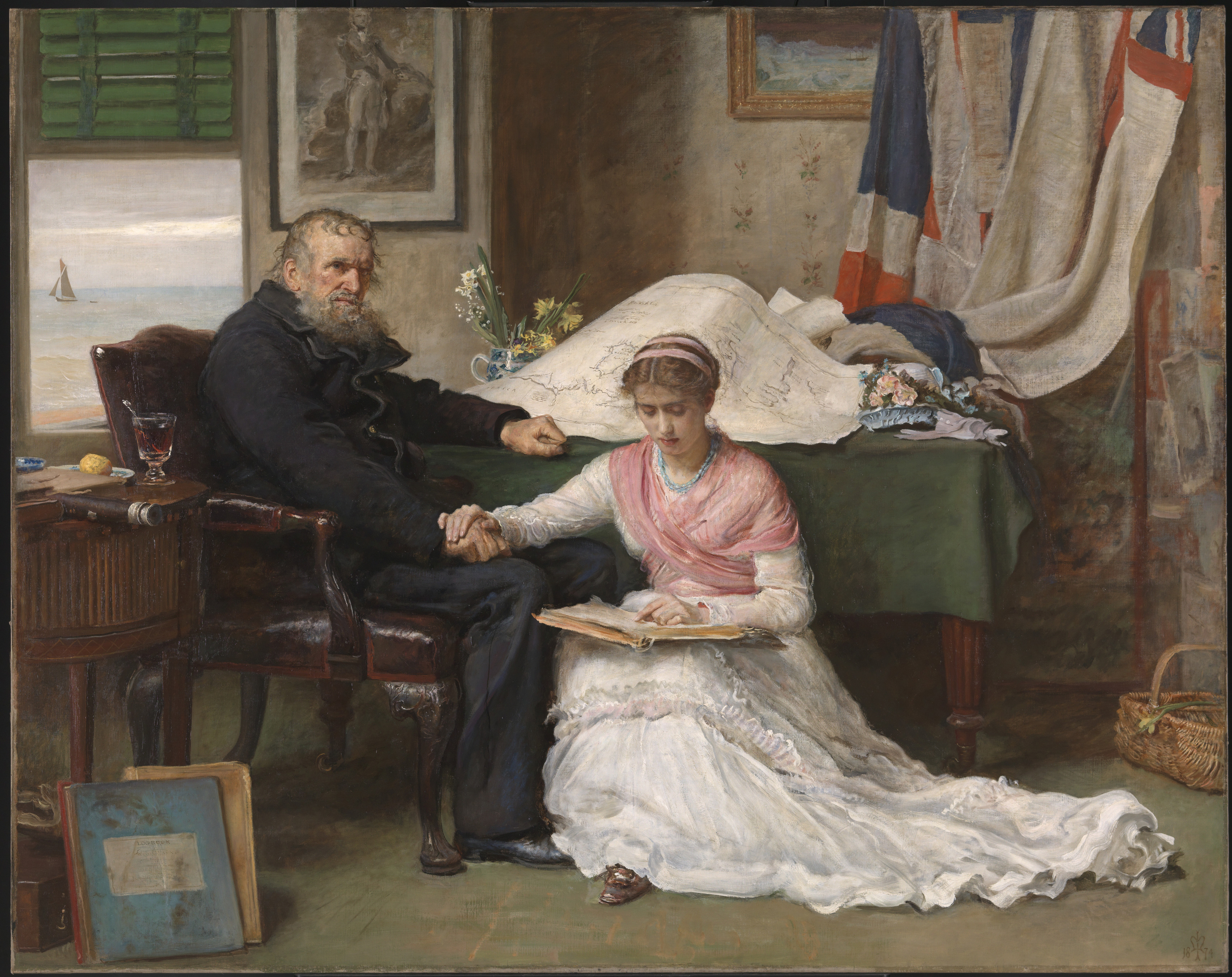
- Artist: John Everett Millais
- Year: 1874
- Medium: Oil on canvas
- Dimensions: 176.5 cm × 222.2 cm (69.5 in × 87.5 in)
- Location: Tate Britain, London

The North-West Passage is an 1874 painting by John Everett Millais. It depicts an elderly sailor sitting in an 18th-century armchair at a desk, with his daughter seated in a stool beside him. He stares out at the viewer, while she reads from a log-book. On the desk is a large chart depicting complex passageways between incompletely charted arctic islands. Outside the window on the left, on sea, is a boat sailing to the left; on the wall over the desk is a painting of a ship trapped in ice, its bow pointing to the right. On the wall behind the seaman, right over his head, is an etching, depicting a young naval officer.

Millais exhibited the painting with the subtitle "It might be done and England should do it", a line imagined to be spoken by the aged sailor. The title and subtitle refer to the repeated failure of British expeditions to find the Northwest Passage, a navigable passageway around the north of the American continent. These expeditions "became synonymous with failure, adversity and death, with men and ships battling against hopeless odds in a frozen wilderness."

== Background ==
The search for the northwest passage had been undertaken repeatedly since the voyages of Henry Hudson in the early 17th century. The most significant attempt was the 1845 expedition led by John Franklin, which had disappeared, apparently without trace. Subsequent expeditions had found evidence that Franklin's two ships had become stuck in ice, and that the crews had died over a number of years from various causes, some having made unsuccessful attempts to escape across the ice. These later expeditions were also unable to navigate a route through Canada’s arctic islands. Millais had the idea for the painting when a new expedition to explore the passage, the British Arctic Expedition of 1875–1876 led by George Nares, was being prepared.

== Creation ==
Millais was keen to use Edward John Trelawny as the model for the figure of his old sailor. He had met him at the funeral of their mutual friend John Leech. Millais's wife Effie Gray persuaded Trelawny to sit for the picture by agreeing to attend a Victorian Turkish bath he was promoting at the time. The female figure was a professional model, Mrs Ellis, who was later used in another painting, Stitch, Stitch, Stitch (1876). The right side of the painting originally depicted two of the sailor's grandchildren, who were modelled by John and Alice Millais, two of Millais's own children. They were shown looking at a globe of the world. But after Millais completed the painting, he became unhappy with the figures of the children, thinking that they distracted the eye from the main figure. He cut out this section of the painting and replaced it with a screen, over which British naval flags are hung.

The chart depicted in the painting is of the northern coast of Canada, as mapped during the Robert McClure expeditions of 1848–53. It was designed by Edward Augustus Inglefield and printed in 1854. Millais may have intended to suggest that the old man was a veteran of one of McClure's expeditions. The painting in the background depicting an ice-trapped ship (partly hidden by the flag) resembles images of McClure's ship HMS Investigator, which was abandoned by McClure and his crew in 1853 after three years of being trapped.

When he saw the painting at the Royal Academy exhibition, Trelawny, who was teetotal, was outraged by the fact that Millais had included a glass of grog and a lemon. According to Millais's son John Guille Millais, he complained to his friends in the Albany Club that "that fellow Millais has handed me down to posterity with a glass of rum-and-water in one hand and a lemon in the other". However, he eventually decided that Millais's Scottish wife Effie was probably to blame because "the Scotch are a nation of sots".

== Exhibition and provenance ==
The painting was first shown at the Royal Academy of Arts in 1874, at which it was highly praised by the art critics of the day. It was then shown at the International Exhibition in Paris in 1876. The painting was acquired by Henry Bolckow of Marton Hall, Middlesbrough for £4,930, from whose estate it was later bought by Henry Tate in 1888, who subsequently donated it to the National Gallery of British Art he had founded, later named after him as the Tate Gallery. When Tate bought the painting for 4,000 guineas there was apparently a "huge cheer" because it meant that it would form part of the national collection which Tate was planning.

== Influence ==
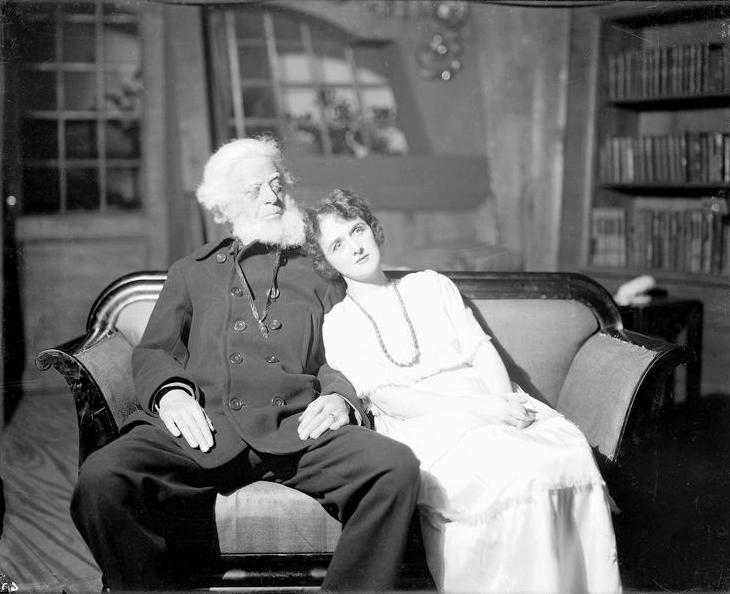
Albert Perry as Shotover and Elizabeth Risdon as Ellie Dunn in the original 1920 production of Heartbreak House

The painting was hugely successful at the time, and was very widely circulated in reproductions. Millais's son says he once saw a reproduction in "the hut of a Hottentot shepherd" in South Africa. Along with Millais's earlier painting The Boyhood of Raleigh it came to symbolise Britain's self-image as a nation of heroic explorers. Millais received a letter from the explorer Sir George Nares in which he said that the painting had had a powerful effect on the spirit of the nation.

The painting was quickly referenced in cartoons. In October 1874 Punch published a pastiche by John Tenniel portraying Disraeli as the old sailor and Britannia in the position of his daughter. A 1915 cartoon by Joseph Morewood Staniforth entitled "The Dardanelles Passage" was captioned "it might be done and England and France can do it", referring to the Gallipoli campaign, which was then just beginning. John Bull and Marianne replaced the old sailor and his daughter.

George Bernard Shaw was inspired by the doleful imagery of failure and frustration in the work when he came to write his play Heartbreak House, which emphasises the pathos and impotence of its characters. The relationship between the main characters, Captain Shotover and Ellie Dunn, was based on the figures in the painting, and one scene partially reproduces the composition. In his last completed play, Shakes versus Shav, Shaw depicts the same scene mimicking Millais's painting.

== See also ==
- List of paintings by John Everett Millais
