= Robert Sheehan =

Irish actor (born 1988)

- Sheehan in 2026
- Born: 7 January 1988 (age 38); Portlaoise, Laois, Ireland
- Education: Galway-Mayo Institute of Technology
- Occupation: Actor
- Years active: 2003–present

Robert Sheehan (born 7 January 1988) is an Irish actor. He is best known for television roles such as Nathan Young in Misfits, Darren Treacy in Love/Hate, and Klaus Hargreeves in The Umbrella Academy, as well as film roles such as Tom Natsworthy in Mortal Engines and Simon Lewis in The Mortal Instruments: City of Bones.

Sheehan has received multiple Irish Film and Television Award nominations and a British Academy Television Award nomination. In 2020, he was listed as number 41 on The Irish Times list of Ireland's greatest film actors.

== Early life and education ==
Sheehan was born in Portlaoise, County Laois. He is the youngest of three children born to Maria and Joe Sheehan, who was a garda.

At school, he played the banjo, the bodhrán, and the spoons, having joked that he was like "Footloose with spoons"; he also participated in Fleadh Cheoil.

Sheehan attended St Paul's school in Portlaoise for primary school. He attended Ballyfin College for secondary school, which went on to become a famous hotel. Unsure of whether acting was a sustainable career choice, he studied film and television at Galway-Mayo Institute of Technology. He missed several months of the course to film Summer of the Flying Saucer, failed his first-year examinations, and decided not to attempt the repeats.

== Career ==
Sheehan became interested in acting in primary school when he played Oliver in Oliver with a Twist. At the age of fourteen, he auditioned for Song for a Raggy Boy, and won the role, spending three months in Cork to film. He later joined the Laois Open Door theatre group, and played the crippled boy in a production of The Cripple of Inishmaan. At the age of 16, Sheehan appeared in the Australian television show Foreign Exchange. He followed it with roles in The Clinic and The Tudors, and portrayed King Louis XIV in Young Blades. In 2008, he appeared in Rock Rivals and Bitter Sweet, a two-part television comedy-drama. During this time, he also appeared in films including Ghostwood.

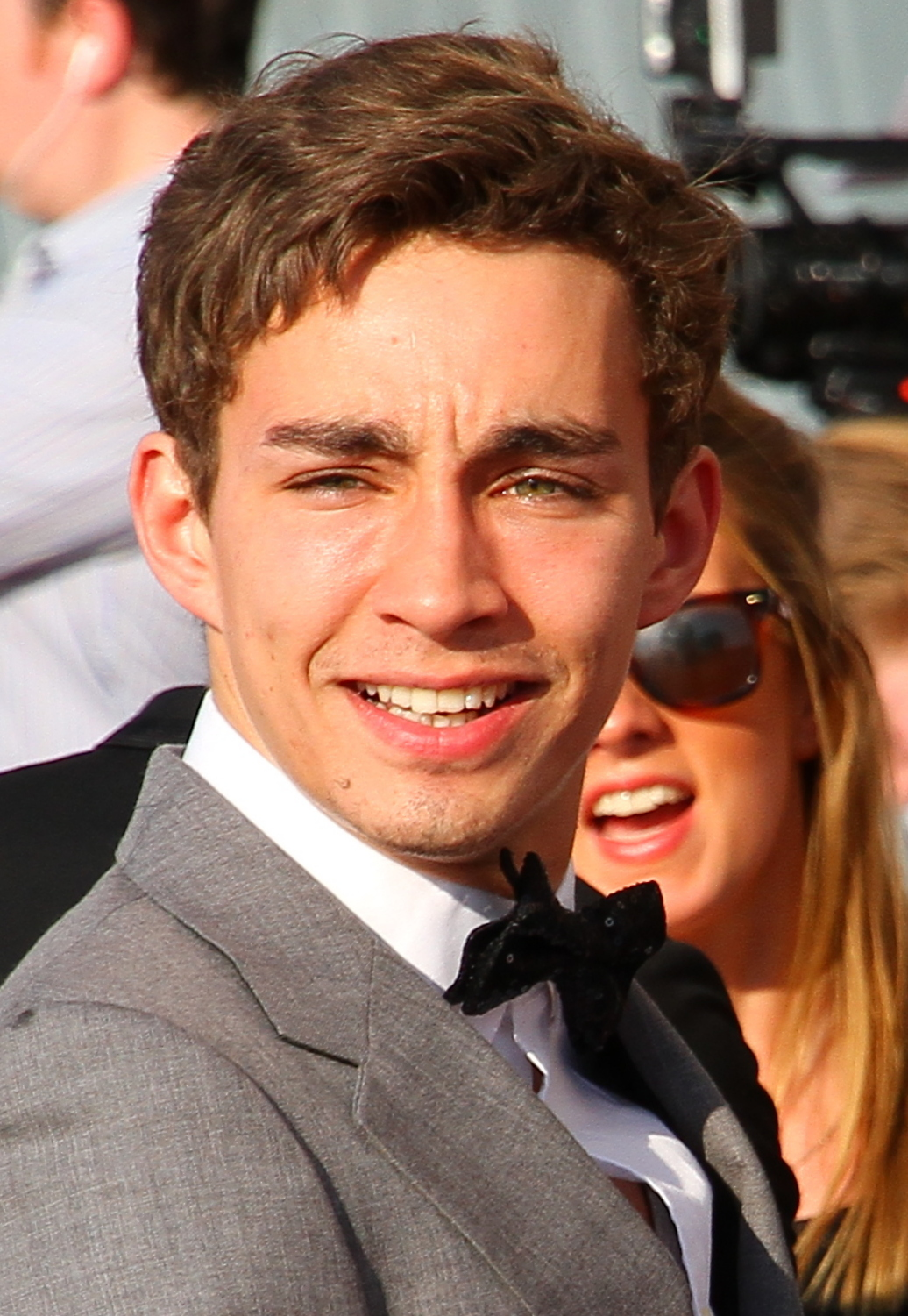
Sheehan at the BAFTA Television Awards in May 2012

After leaving the Galway-Mayo Institute of Technology, Sheehan starred as one of the lead characters in Cherrybomb in 2009. In March 2009, he appeared in the role of BJ in the Channel 4 trilogy Red Riding. Sheehan described the role as "weighty" and a "step up" from his previous work, and credits the show with changing his career.

From 2009 to 2010, he starred as Nathan Young, a young offender, in the first two series of the British TV series Misfits. In April 2011, it was announced that Sheehan would not be returning to the show for the third season. Regarded as a "cult favourite", Sheehan connected "intensely" with the role, which he later described as "defining", and "a lovely, gorgeous memory for me," and remarked it was "challenging" to leave it behind. In May 2011, he was nominated for a BAFTA Award in the "Male Supporting Actor" category for his role in Misfits. Beginning in 2010, he played Darren, a member of gangland Dublin in Love/Hate. He accepted the part because he wanted to work with Stuart Carolan and Dave Caffrey, and featured in three seasons. After leaving the series, his character's ubiquitous blue hoodie was donated to the Dunamaise Theater in Portlaoise, and he remarked it was "tough to watch [the] show carry on without [me]". He was nominated for an Irish Film and Television Award for the role in 2011 and 2013. In 2011, Sheehan played Kay in Season of the Witch alongside Nicolas Cage and Ron Perlman.

Sheehan was nominated for an Irish Film and Television Award in the Rising Star category in 2010. The following year, he starred in the film Killing Bono, and in John Crowley's production of The Playboy of the Western World at the Old Vic Theatre. Sheehan appeared in the second season of the BBC crime drama series Accused, which aired in 2012. He played Simon Lewis in the 2013 film The Mortal Instruments: City of Bones, and followed it with roles in Anita B., The Road Within, Moonwalkers, and The Messenger in 2014 and 2015. In late 2015, he played Richard III in Trevor Nunn's revival of The Wars of the Roses, an adaptation of William Shakespeare's plays Richard III and the three-part Henry VI. In a 2018 interview with Hot Press, Sheehan described the role as his recent favourite, citing the "magic" and "transcendent experience" of being on stage.

The Song of Sway Lake premiered at the Los Angeles Film Festival in 2017 and was released theatrically the following year. It was filmed prior to 2014, and reflecting on the role in 2019, Sheehan described himself as "immensely proud". During 2017, he also appeared in Geostorm and featured in the second season of Fortitude, for which he was nominated for an Irish Film and Television Award. In 2018, he appeared in Genius: Picasso as Carlos Casagemas and in The Young Offenders Christmas special as a caricatured version of himself. He also appeared in several films; he starred alongside David Tennant in Bad Samaritan, appeared in the neo-noir film Mute, and starred in Mortal Engines in the leading role of Tom Natsworthy.

In 2019, he starred in the Netflix Original series The Umbrella Academy as Klaus Hargreeves.

On 15 October 2021, Sheehan published his debut novel, Disappearing Act: A Host of Other Characters in 16 Short Stories.

He was cast in August 2022 to be one of the main villains in the upcoming film Red Sonja. He will be playing Draygan.

In May 2024, Sheehan will play Withnail in the world premiere of Withnail and I by Bruce Robinson and directed by Sean Foley based on the 1987 film at the Birmingham Repertory Theatre. In July, he will appear in Reunion written and directed by Mark O'Rowe for the Galway International Arts Festival.

== Personal life ==
Sheehan resides in West Cork. He has also lived in London and Los Angeles.

He has spoken openly about experimenting with his sexuality when younger, but identifies himself as heterosexual.

He was in a relationship with actress Sofia Boutella from March 2014 until October 2018.

== Filmography ==
=== Film ===
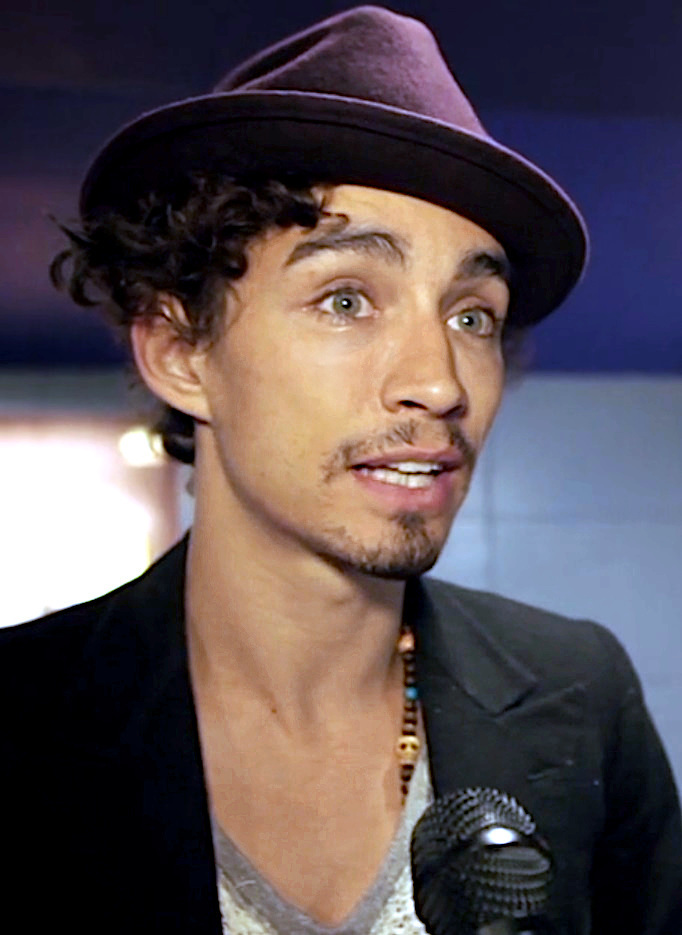
Robert Sheehan at diff 2015

Year	Title	Role	Notes	Ref.
2003	An Cuainín	Duncan's son	Short film	
2003	Song for a Raggy Boy	O'Reilly 58		
2003	A Dublin Story	Clocker	Short film	
2006	Ghostwood	Tim		
2007	An Créatúr	Conor Buckley	Short film	
2008	Summer of the Flying Saucer	Danny		
2008	Lowland Fell	Mark	Short film	
2009	Cherrybomb	Luke		
2011	A Turtle's Tale: Sammy's Adventures	Ray	Voice role	
2011	Season of the Witch	Kay Von Wollenbart		
2011	Demons Never Die	Archie Eden		
2011	Killing Bono	Ivan McCormick		
2013	The Mortal Instruments: City of Bones	Simon Lewis		
2014	Anita B.	Eli		
2014	The Road Within	Vincent Rhoads		
2015	Moonwalkers	Leon		
2015	The Messenger	Jack		
2016	Jet Trash	Lee	Also producer	
2017	Three Summers	Roland		
2017	Geostorm	Duncan Taylor		
2017	The Song of Sway Lake	Nikolai		
2018	Mute	Luba		
2018	Bad Samaritan	Sean Falco		
2018	Mortal Engines	Tom Natsworthy		
2024	Did You Hear About Erskine Fogarty?	Erskine Fogarty	Short film	
2024	Standing on the Shoulders of Kitties	Himself		
2025	Red Sonja	Dragan		

=== Television ===
Year	Title	Role	Notes	Ref.
2004	Foreign Exchange	Cormac MacNamara	Series regular	
2005	Young Blades	Louis XIV	Series regular	
2006	The Clinic	Shane Hunter	Episode: #4.03	
2006	Bel's Boys	Max	Episode: #2.10	
2008	The Tudors	Apprentice	Episode: Everything Is Beautiful	
2008	Rock Rivals	Addison Teller	Series regular	
2008	Bitter Sweet	Liam	TV miniseries	
2009	Red Riding	BJ	TV miniseries	
2009–2010	Misfits	Nathan Young	Main cast (Seasons 1–2; 13 episodes, 1 internet mini-episode)	
2010	Coming Up	Jason	Episode #5.07: Dip	
2010–2013	Love/Hate	Darren Tracey	Series regular (Season 1–3; 16 episodes)	
2011	The Borrowers	Spiller	Television film	
2012	Accused	Stephen Cartwright	2 episodes: Stephen's Story, Tina's Story	
2012	Me and Mrs Jones	Billy	Series regular	
2017	Fortitude	Vladek Klimov	Series regular (series 2)	
2018	Genius: Picasso	Carlos Casagemas	4 episodes	
2018	The Young Offenders	Himself	Episode: Christmas Special	
2019–2024	The Umbrella Academy	Klaus Hargreeves	Main cast	
2022	The Last Bus	Dalton Monkhouse		

=== Theatre ===
Year	Production	Role	Venue
2011	The Playboy of the Western World	Christy Mahon	The Old Vic
2015	The War of the Roses	Richard III	Rose Theatre Kingston
2022	Endgame	Clov	Gate Theatre
2024	Withnail and I	Withnail	Birmingham Repertory Theatre
2024	Reunion	Maurice	Galway International Arts Festival

== Awards and honours ==
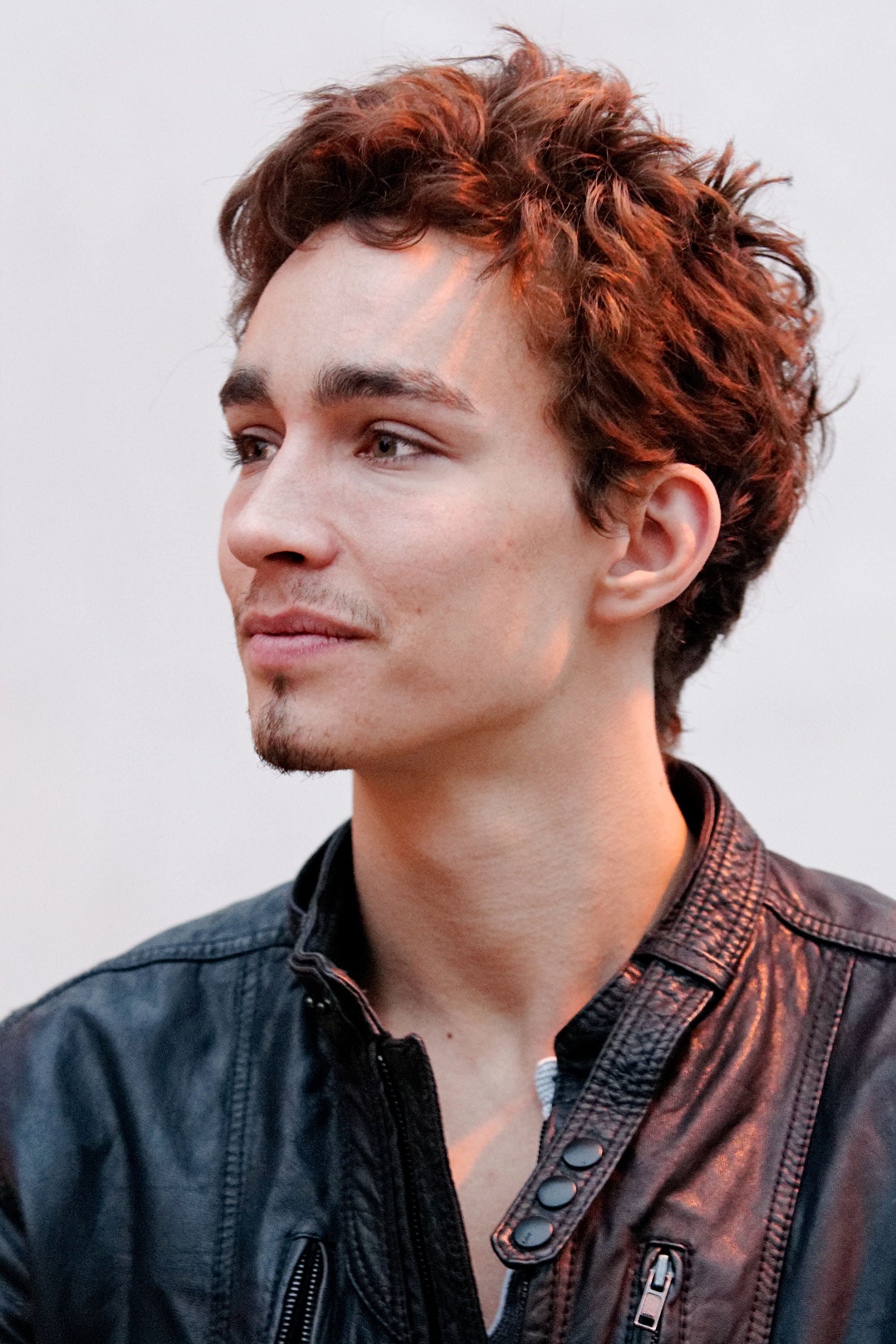
Sheehan at the Minghella Film Festival, March 2011

In September 2013, Sheehan was honoured by University College Dublin's Literary and Historical Society. In October 2015, he received the Burke Medal for Contribution to Discourse Through The Arts from College Historical Society in Trinity College Dublin.

Year	Award	Category	Role	Result	Ref.
2010	IFTA	Rising Star		Nominated	
2011	BAFTA	Supporting Actor	Nathan Young – Misfits	Nominated	
2011	IFTA	Actor in a Lead Role – Television	Darren Treacy – Love/Hate	Nominated	
2012	IFTA	Actor in a Supporting Role – Television	Nathan Young – Misfits	Nominated	
2013	IFTA	Actor in a Lead Role – Television	Darren Treacy – Love/Hate	Nominated	
2017	IFTA	Actor in a Supporting Role – Drama	Vladek Klimov – Fortitude	Nominated	
