= Foley House, Malvern =

Foley House
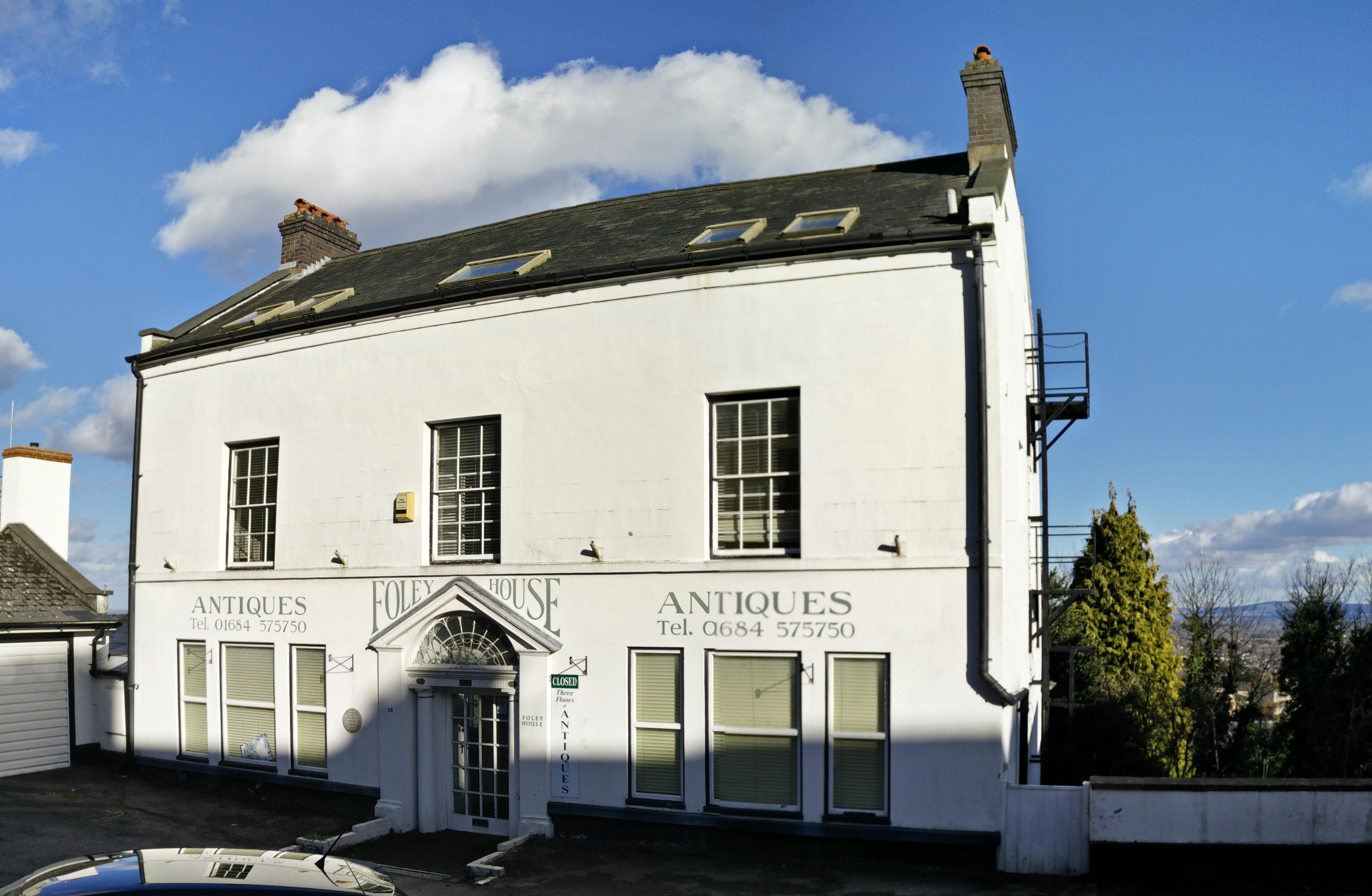
- The building in March 2015

General information
- Type: House
- Address: 28 Worcester Road
- Town or city: Malvern, Worcestershire
- Country: England
- Coordinates: 52.1131°N 2.3298°W
- Completed: Early to mid nineteenth century
- Designations: Grade II listed

Foley House is a Grade II listed building at 28 Worcester Road, Malvern, Worcestershire, England.

The two-storey house was created in the early to mid nineteenth century. It has rendered walls and a slate roof.

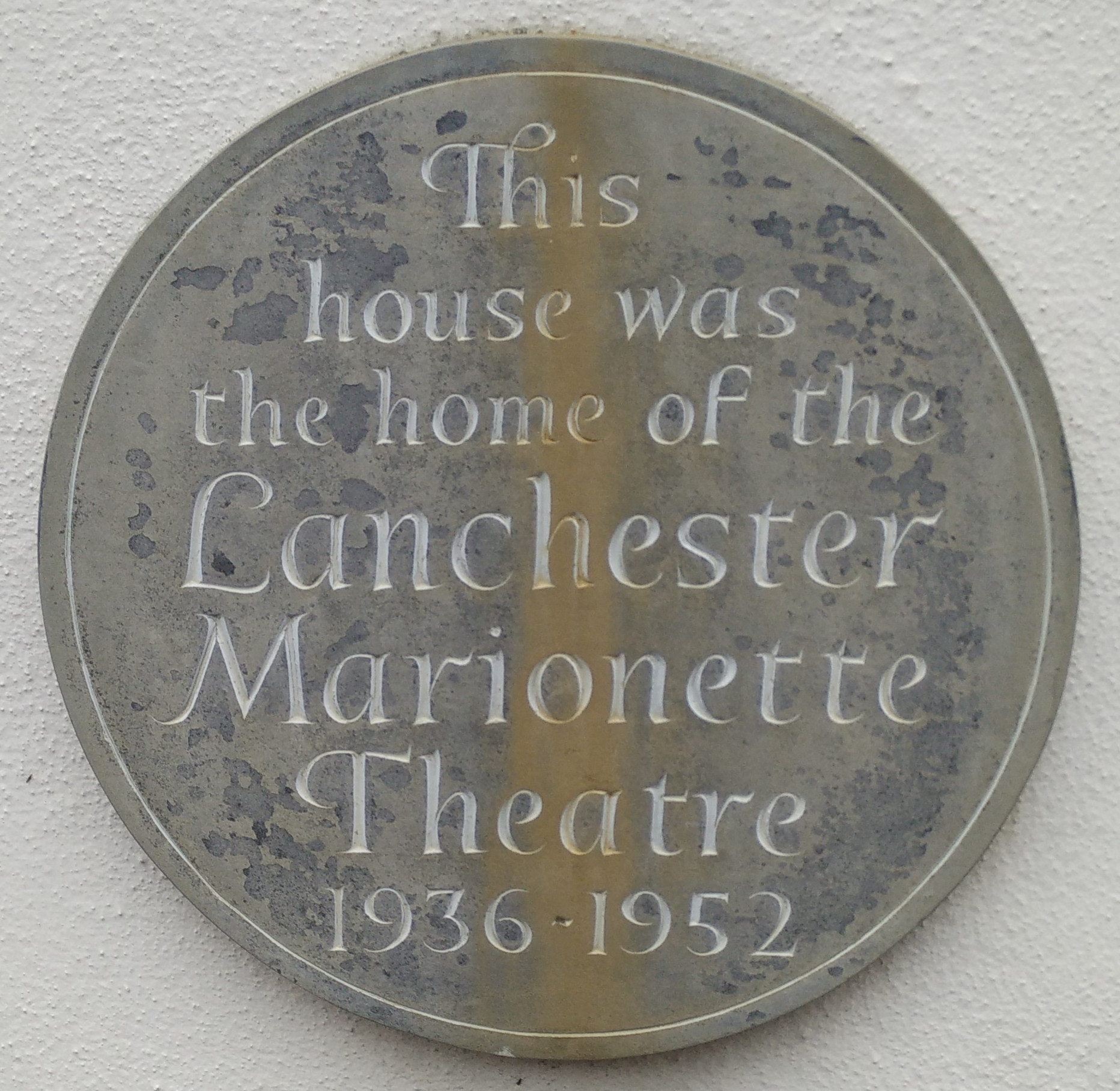
Lanchester Marionettes plaque

A blue plaque on the house commemorates the fact that from 1936 to 1946 it was occupied by Waldo and Muriel Lanchester and their Lanchester Marionettes theatre company.

The building was given "Grade II listed" protection in November 1949. It was as recently as 2015 an antiques centre, however is currently vacant.

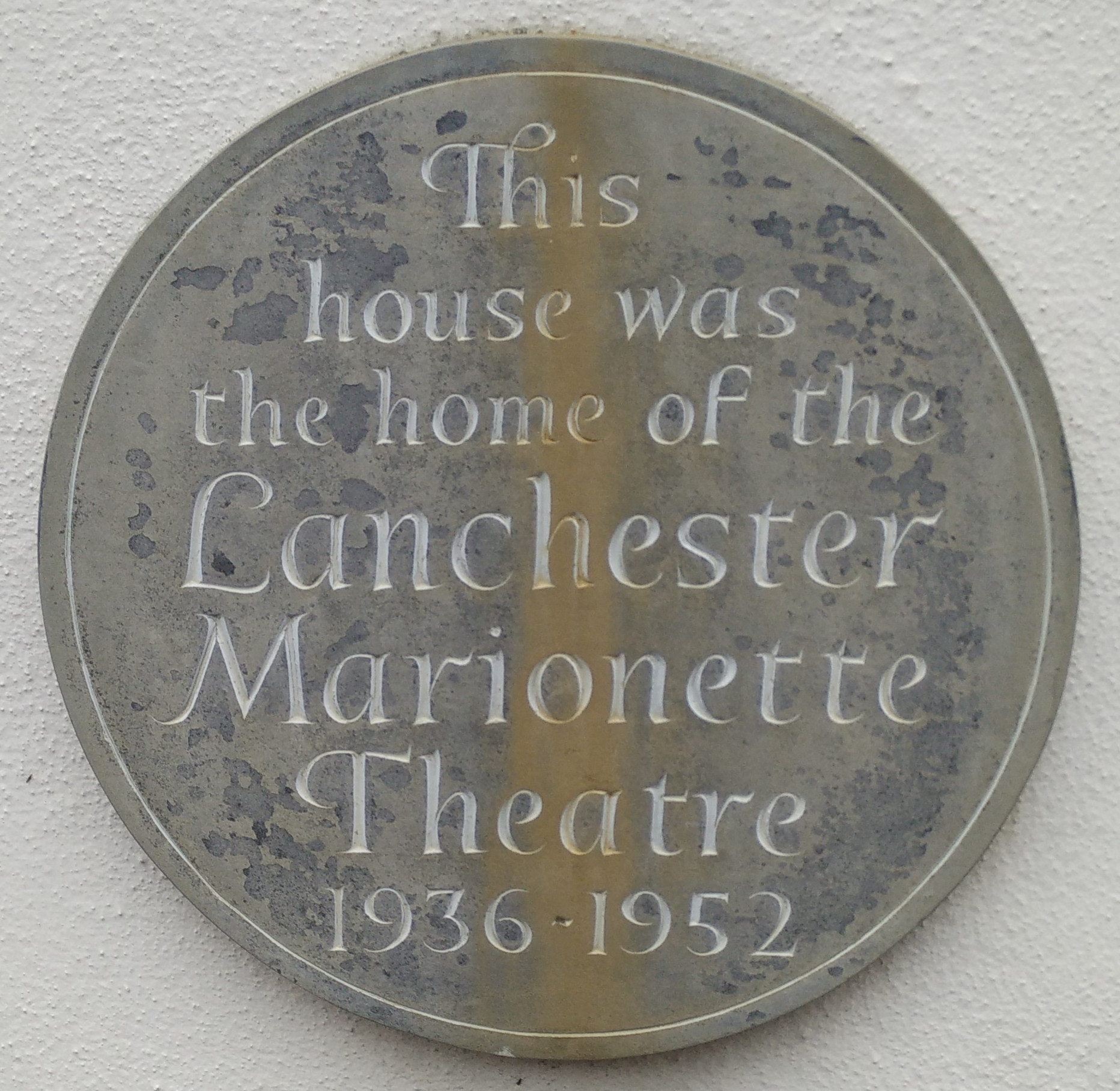
Plaque on Foley House
