= Waldo Lanchester =

British puppeteer (1897-1978)

- Born: Waldo Sullivan Lanchester; 6 May 1897; London, England
- Died: 15 December 1978 (aged 81); Stratford-upon-Avon, Warwickshire, England
- Occupation: Puppeteer
- Spouse: Muriel Lanchester
- Parent: Edith Lanchester (mother)
- Relatives: Elsa Lanchester (sister)

Waldo Sullivan Lanchester (6 May 1897 – 15 December 1978) was a British puppeteer who founded the Lanchester Marionettes (1935–1962), a puppet theatre that was based in Malvern, and later in Stratford-upon-Avon. He wrote a book on the revival of puppeteering and commissioned George Bernard Shaw to write his last completed play Shakes versus Shav in 1949. In 1952, Donald W. Seager wrote that "Waldo Lanchester has consistently been associated with all that is best in the puppet theatre." Archibald Henderson called him "England's greatest puppetmaster."

== Early life ==
Lanchester was the son of James "Shamus" Sullivan (1872–1945) and Edith "Biddy" Lanchester (1871–1966). His younger sister was the actress Elsa Lanchester. Two of the earliest puppets he created were named "Baldo and Belsa", the pet names of himself and his sister Elsa. The family were considered Bohemian, and refused to legalise their union in any conventional way to satisfy the era's conservative society.

== Puppetry career ==
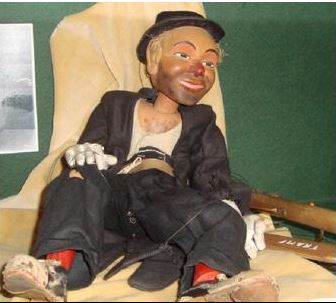
The Tramp Clown marionette made by Waldo and Muriel Lanchester

Lanchester and his wife Muriel became interested in the puppetry revival of the early 20th century pioneered by H.W. Whanslaw, whose book Everybody's Theatre was published in 1923. He joined Whanslaw to found the British Puppet and Model Theatre Guild. They founded the Whanslaw-Lanchester Marionettes a year later, based at the London Marionette Theatre in Stamford Brook. According to the Victoria and Albert Museum, "together they evolved aspects of marionettes such as the vertical control and new types of joints and methods of balancing. The London Marionette Theatre was the first to broadcast puppets on television, making nine broadcasts from the Baird Studios in 1933".

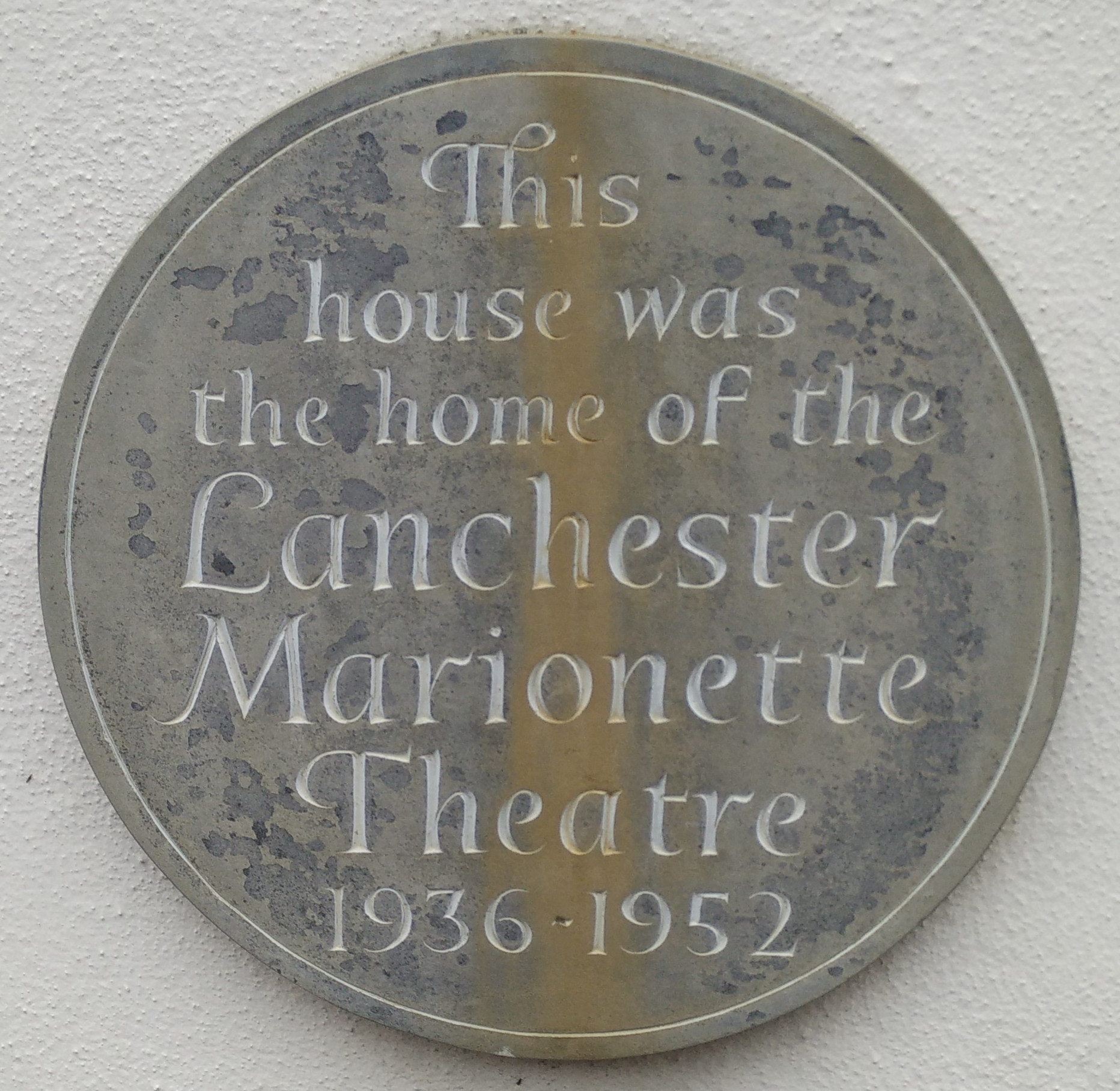
The plaque outside Foley House, Malvern

Waldo Lanchester branched off from Whanslaw to perform at the Malvern Festival of 1935 in a tent pitched in the garden of Foley House, home of his future wife Muriel who was a potter and exhibited there. They were married and opened the Lanchester Marionette Theatre at Foley House, in Malvern, in 1936. In 1937 he wrote Hand Puppets and String Puppets in which he argued for the teaching of puppetry to children as it "develops the power of initiative, teaches skillful use of tools, paint brush, and needle, makes practical use of historical research for costume design and architecture. Stage fright is banished, the children being only too eager to take part behind the scenes." He created a wide range of puppets used to perform Circus and Underwater Ballet stories, which were seen by the young Princess Elizabeth at Buckingham Palace in 1938. During World War II, the Lanchesters toured England with their puppets for the Entertainments National Service Association (ENSA).

Lanchester was keen to preserve the history of puppetry. He rescued Victorian puppets from potential destruction. In tandem with his puppet theatre, he ran a toy shop in Henley Street, Stratford-upon-Avon.

== Shakes versus Shav ==
Bernard Shaw had shown an interest in marionettes throughout his life. Lanchester showed Shaw two puppets portraying Shakespeare and Shaw, asking Shaw to write a short drama for them. Having seen the performances of the Lanchester marionettes over the years, Shaw agreed to write Shakes versus Shav for the company in 1949. Lanchester carved the six marionettes (heads were carved by Jack Whitehead) and Muriel costumed them, having sought advice from Scotland on the correct tartans for the puppets representing Rob Roy and Macbeth. The Shaw puppet is now housed in the George Bernard Shaw Museum, Shaw's Corner, at Ayot St Lawrence, the Shakespeare puppet is in the Shakespeare Birthplace Trust and the other four puppets—MacBeth, Rob Roy, Captain Shotover and Ellie Dunn—are in the Staffordshire County Museum at Shugborough Hall.

== Bibliography ==
- Lanchester, Waldo S. (1949). Hand Puppets and String Puppets. Dryad Press.
