= Harry Whanslaw =

British puppeteer (1883–1965)

- Born: 3 November 1883; Putney, London
- Died: 26 March 1965 (aged 81); Putney, London
- Occupations: Puppeteer, author, illustrator
- Years active: 1923–1965
- Spouse: Hilda Beeson (1897-1974)
- Parents: Robert Henry Whanslaw (1854-1928) (father); Edith Trimby (1858-1938) (mother)

Harry William "Whanny" Whanslaw (3 November 1883 – 26 March 1965) was a British author, illustrator and puppeteer who was best known for prompting the revival of puppetry in the United Kingdom in the 1920s.

== Family ==
Harry Whanslaw was born on 3 November 1883 in Putney, London. He was the only child of his father, Robert, who had been born in Ohio, and his mother Edith, descended from a family in Wiltshire. The Whanslaw family were longstanding residents of Putney and Wandsworth, with the first mention of the family being made in 1674.

== Life ==
During World War 1, Harry served in the Royal Army Medical Corps at the 2nd Northern General Hospital in Leeds during the final two years of the war. In 1924, Harry would marry Hilda Beeson, but the couple had no children.

== Puppeteering ==
In 1923, he published his book Everybody's Theatre, which lead to the founding of The British Model Theatre Guild, which would later be renamed the British Puppet and Model Theatre Guild of which he was president. He with fellow puppeteer Waldo Lanchester also founded the London Marionette Theatre in 1926. In 1935, Whanslaw set up another puppet theatre, the Studio Marionette Theatre, in his house in London, where he put on regular performances along with students and friends. During World War II, he worked with young people and the homeless, creating puppets from bomb-damaged buildings. During the 1950s he created puppets for children’s television, mainly Cactus the Camel, who appeared in Telescope.
