= Haunted by Heroes =

American rock band from Pacifica, California

- Also known as: HxH, H X H
- Origin: Pacifica, California
- Genres: Rock and roll, hard rock
- Discography: Haunted by Heroes (2013)
- Years active: 2008–2017
- Members: Nick Rigling; Chris Rigling; Max Lazarus
- Past members: Charley Rutledge; Geddy Franco; Brandon Lurie

Haunted by Heroes (H X H) was an American rock band from Pacifica, California. Formerly known as The Thrashers, Haunted by Heroes achieved national notoriety for their claim to have been "America's youngest rock band".

== Career ==
The Thrashers were formed in 2008 by twin brothers Nick and Chris Rigling, influenced by bands such as Led Zeppelin and Metallica. They changed their name to Haunted by Heroes as a tribute to older rock legends around 2011. Around the same time, they were reportedly in talks for an untitled television show.

After playing more than one hundred live shows, Haunted by Heroes became a contestant on America's Got Talent in September 2012. For their performance of Twisted Sister's "We're Not Gonna Take It", they were joined by the band's lead singer Dee Snider. They had previously appeared on The Today Show, where host Matt Lauer praised the band as "unique, with a larger-than-life sound."

The band was managed by Brent Turner. Their self-titled debut album, also called Haunted by Heroes, was produced by Sylvia Massy. Their debut music video for "Devil's Slide" came out in January 2013; their second music video, "Rocket Girl", was directed by Brian Smith and premiered in June 2013. In 2014, they released the music video for "Stomp It Out", which was produced by Michael Davis and supported by the nonprofit Free2Luv; the video promoted an anti-bullying message.

The band broke up circa 2017, having already lost members Max Lazarus and Charley Rutledge.

== Members ==
=== Current (at time of break-up) ===
- Nick Rigling (lead vocals, bass guitar)
- Chris Rigling (drums)
- Max Lazarus (lead guitar)

=== Former ===
- Charley Rutledge (rhythm guitar)
- Geddy Franco (lead guitar)
- Brandon Lurie (keyboards)

== Discography ==
- Haunted by Heroes (2013)
