= Baucis and Philemon =

Ancient Greek mythical characters

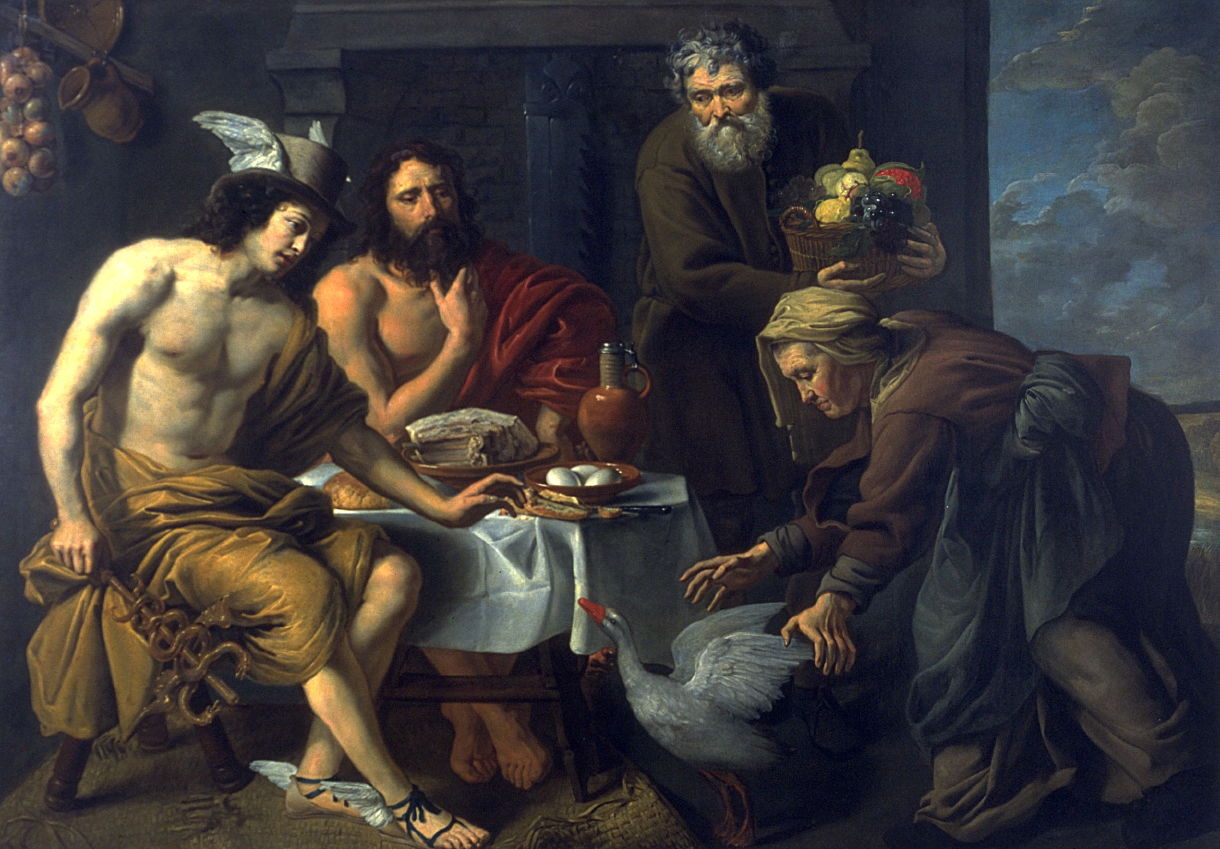
Jacob van Oost Mercury and Jupiter in the House of Philemon and Baucis

Jupiter and Mercury in the house of Philemon and Baucis, Adam Elsheimer, c1608, Dresden

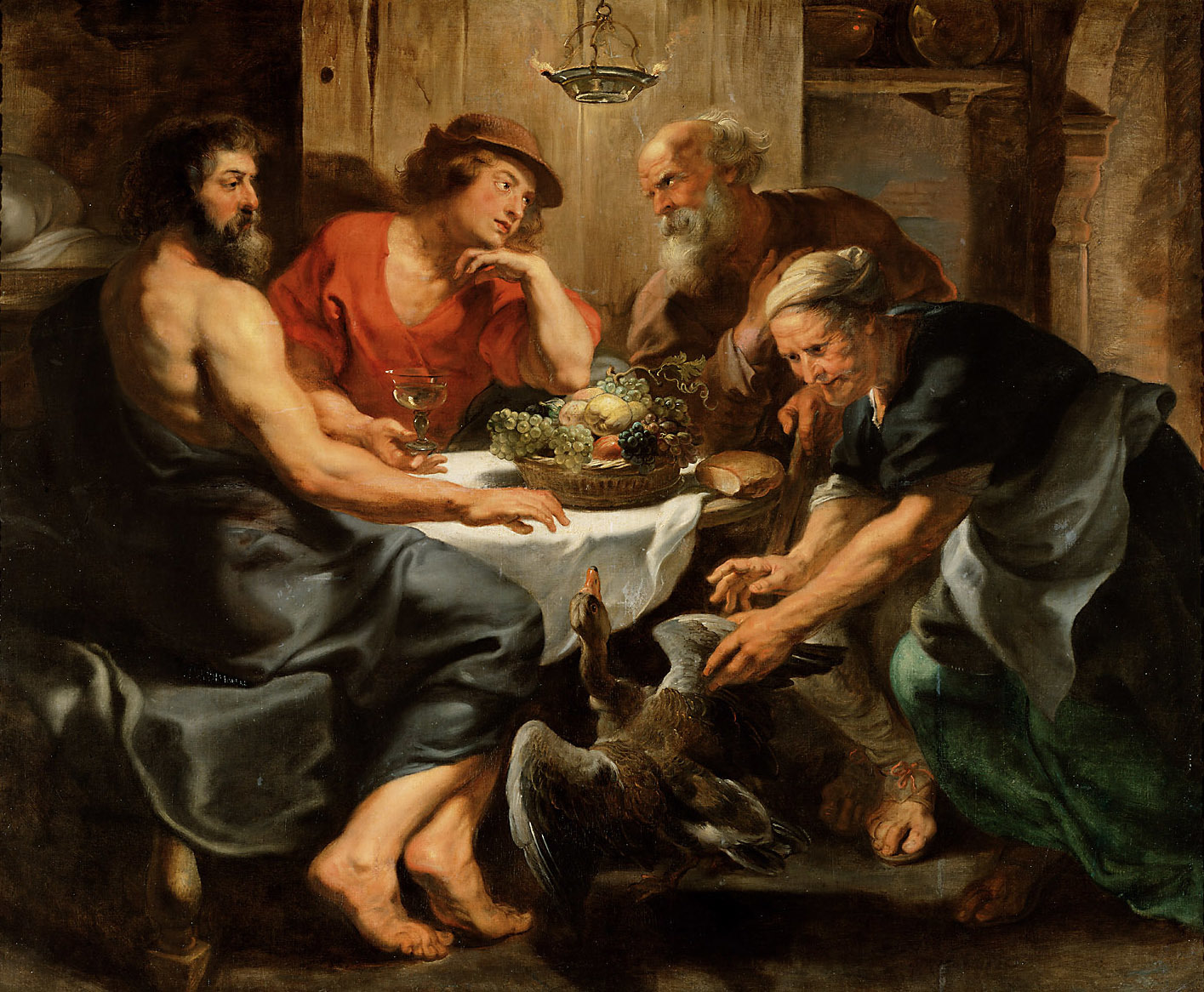
Rubens, 1630–32

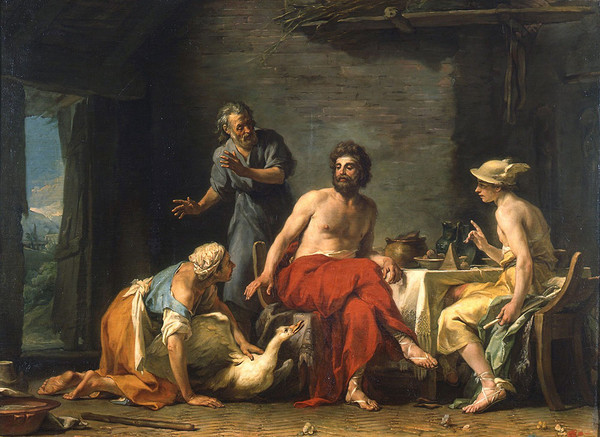
Jean-Bernard Restout, 1769

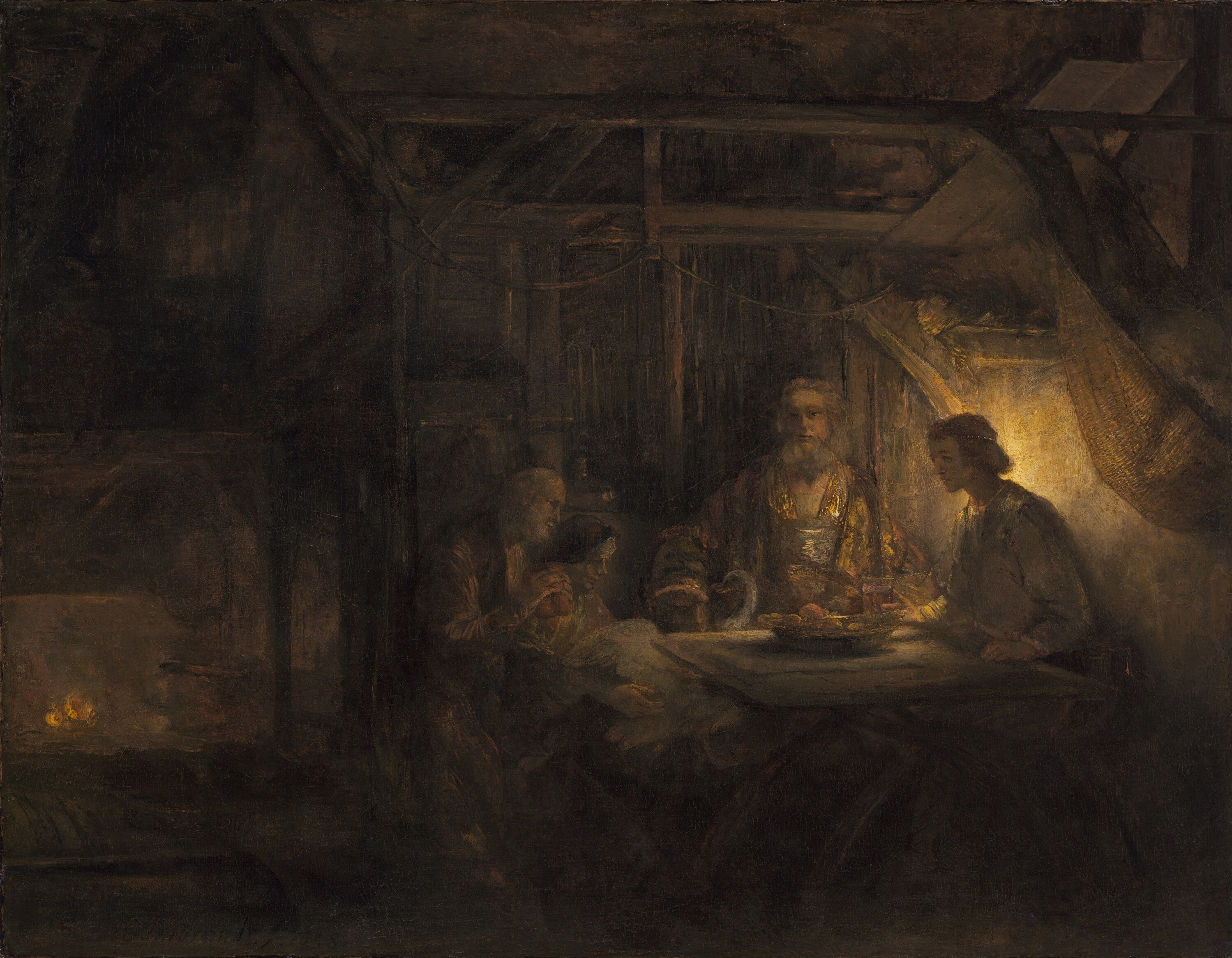
Rembrandt, 1658

Baucis and Philemon (Latin: Baucis et Philēmōn) are two characters from Roman mythology, only known from Ovid's Metamorphoses. Baucis and Philemon were an old married couple in the region of Tyana, which Ovid places in Phrygia, and the only ones in their town to welcome disguised gods Jupiter and Mercury, thus embodying the pious exercise of hospitality, the ritualized guest-friendship termed hospitium.

== Story ==
Jupiter and Mercury came disguised as ordinary traveling peasants, and began asking the people of the town for a place to sleep that night. They had been rejected by all, "so wicked were the people of that land", when at last they came to Baucis and Philemon's simple rustic cottage. Though the couple were poor, their generosity far surpassed that of their rich neighbors, among whom the gods found "doors bolted and no word of kindness".

After serving the two guests food and wine (which Ovid depicts with pleasure in the details), Baucis noticed that, although she had refilled her guests' beech wood cups many times, the pitcher was still full (from which derives the phrase "Hermes' Pitcher"). Realizing that her guests were gods, she and her husband "raised their hands in supplication and implored indulgence for their simple home and fare". Philemon thought of catching and killing the goose that guarded their house and making it into a meal, but when he went to do so, it ran to safety in Jupiter's lap. Jupiter said they need not slay the goose and that they should leave the town. This was because he was going to destroy the town and all those who had turned them away and not provided due hospitality. He told Baucis and Philemon to climb the mountain with him and Mercury and not to turn back until they reached the top.

After climbing to the summit ("as far as an arrow could shoot in one pull"), Baucis and Philemon looked back on their town and saw that it had been destroyed by a flood and that Jupiter had turned their cottage into an ornate temple. The couple's wish to be guardians of the temple was granted. They also asked that when time came for one of them to die, that the other would die as well. Upon their death, the couple were changed into an intertwining pair of trees, an oak and a linden, standing in the deserted boggy terrain.

== Analysis ==
The story belongs to Aarne-Thompson-Uther tale type 750. It does not appear elsewhere in ancient writings.

== Adaptations ==
- Jean de la Fontaine's poem follows Ovid closely.
- Jonathan Swift wrote a poem on the subject of Baucis and Philemon in 1709.
- Joseph Haydn wrote a marionette opera Philemon und Baucis, oder Jupiters Reise auf die Erde in 1773.
- Baucis and Philemon are characters in the fifth act of Goethe's Faust II (1832).
- Gogol wrote an ironic and bittersweet reworking of the legend in his 1835 novella The Old World Landowners.
- "The Miraculous Pitcher" is one of the tales in Nathaniel Hawthorne's A Wonder-Book for Girls and Boys (1851).
- Charles Gounod wrote his opéra comique Philémon et Baucis in 1860.
- The Lanchester Marionettes created a puppet show Philemon and Baucis in 1952
- Referenced by Shakespeare in Much Ado About Nothing when Don Pedro courts Hero for Claudio (2.1.95), and also in As You Like It by Jaques (3.3.7-8).

== See also ==
- Darby and Joan
- Hospitium
- Sodom and Gomorrah
- Xenia (Greek)
