= Heartbreak House =

Play by George Bernard Shaw

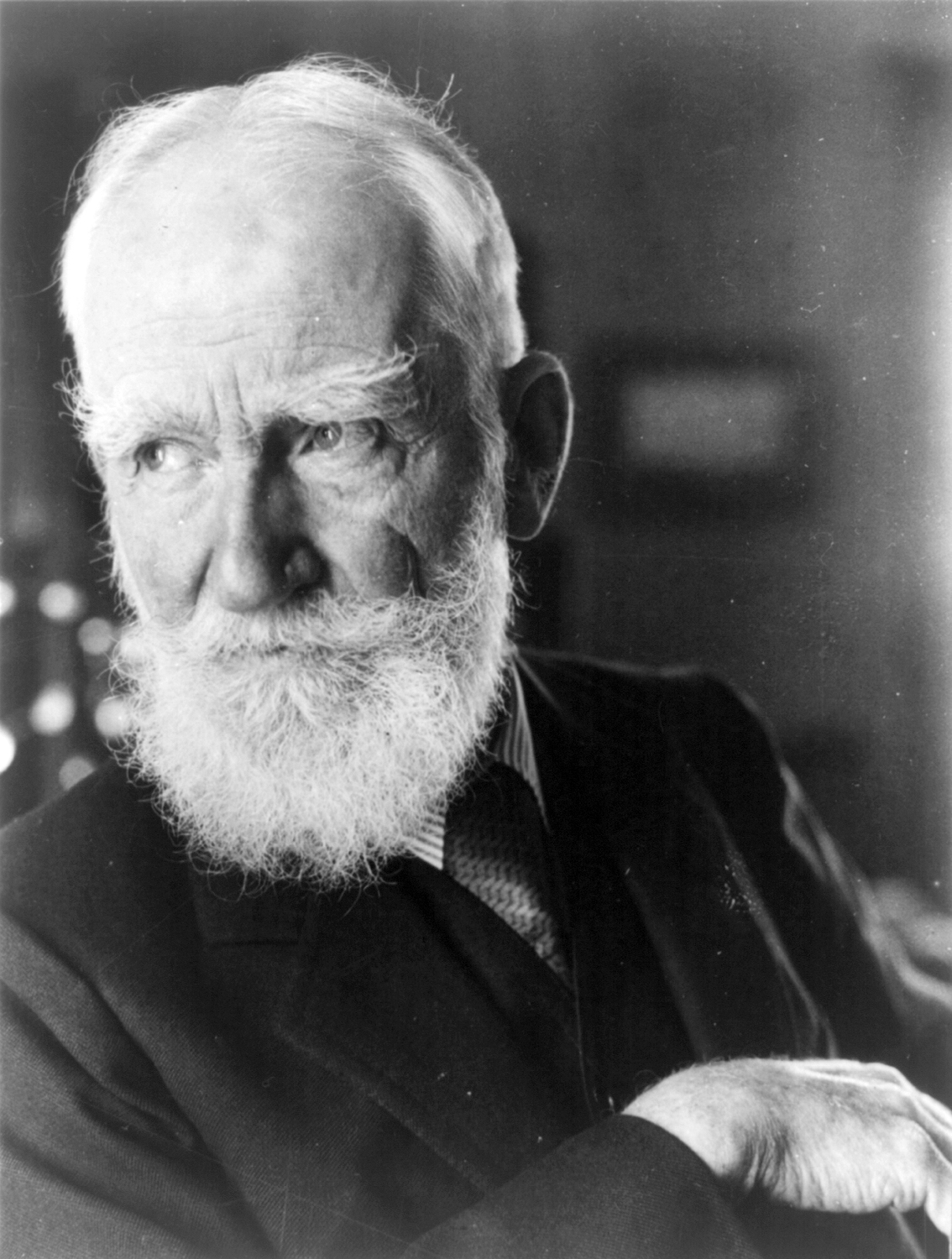
- Original language: English
- Written by: George Bernard Shaw
- Subject: A dinner party at an eccentric household during World War I
- Genre: Chekhovian tragicomedy
- Setting: England, World War I

Premiere
- Date: November 1920
- Place: Garrick Theatre, New York

Heartbreak House: A Fantasia in the Russian Manner on English Themes is a play written by Bernard Shaw during the First World War, published in 1919 and first performed in November 1920 at the Garrick Theatre, New York, followed by a West End production the following year.

The play reflects Shaw's disillusion with post-war Britain. It contrasts cultured but self-absorbed and politically irresponsible people on the one hand and aggressive philistines on the other. Heartbreak House contains a self-mocking depiction of Shaw himself in the central character, Captain Shotover.

== Background ==
By 1920, Shaw was in his sixties and had been writing for the theatre for nearly thirty years. His plays included Arms and the Man, The Devil's Disciple, Man and Superman, Major Barbara and Androcles and the Lion. His last play before the First World War had been the highly successful Pygmalion. He was internationally famous, and commented "I have advertized myself so well that I find myself, whilst still in middle life, almost as legendary a person as the Flying Dutchman". He had little regard for London theatre managements, and chose to have some of his plays premiered overseas, including The Devil's Disciple (1897, New York), and Pygmalion (1913, Vienna); Caesar and Cleopatra was staged in Berlin and New York (both 1906) before being seen in London.

In 1920 the New-York based Theatre Guild asked Shaw for the rights to revive The Devil's Disciple, but instead he offered the Guild the premiere of Heartbreak House, though warning them that instead of pleasing the public for two hours, the play would "put the utmost strain upon their attention for three and send them home exhausted but impressed".

Shaw, generally a quick writer, had taken an uncharacteristically long time to write Heartbreak House (originally entitled The Studio in the Clouds). He wrote in the preface to the published play that he had begun writing it before the First World war, although his biographer Michael Holroyd dates the writing to 1916.

== Premieres ==
The play was first performed in New York by the Theatre Guild company at the Garrick Theatre in November 1920. It was well received and ran for 125 performances over five months. It was first presented in England on 18 October 1921, at the Court Theatre, London, running for 63 performances. Between the two English-language productions the play had been seen in Vienna in German translation.

=== Broadway and West End casts ===
Role	New York	London
Ellie Dunn	Elizabeth Risdon	Ellen O'Malley
Nurse Guinness	Helen Westley	Lilian Talbot
Captain Shotover	Albert Perry	Brember Wills
Lady Utterword (Ariadne)	Lucile Watson	Edith Evans
Hesione Hushabye	Effie Shannon	Mary Grey
Mazzini Dunn	Erskine Sanford	H. O. Nicholson
Hector Hushabye	Fred Eric	James Dale
Boss Mangan	Dudley Digges	Alfred Clark
Randall Utterword	Ralph Roeder	Eric Maturin
Burglar	Henry Travers	Charles Groves

== Plot summary ==
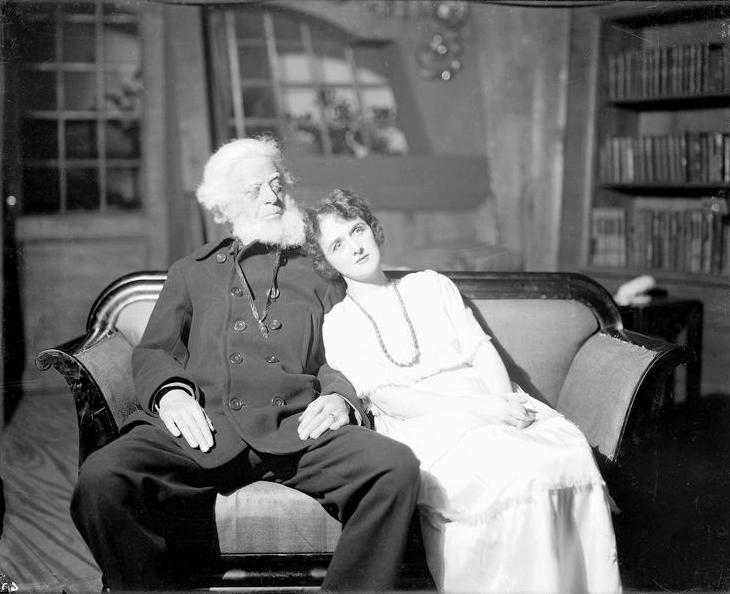
Albert Perry as Shotover and Elisabeth Risdon as Ellie Dunn in the original 1920 production. This scene was inspired by Millais' painting The North-West Passage.

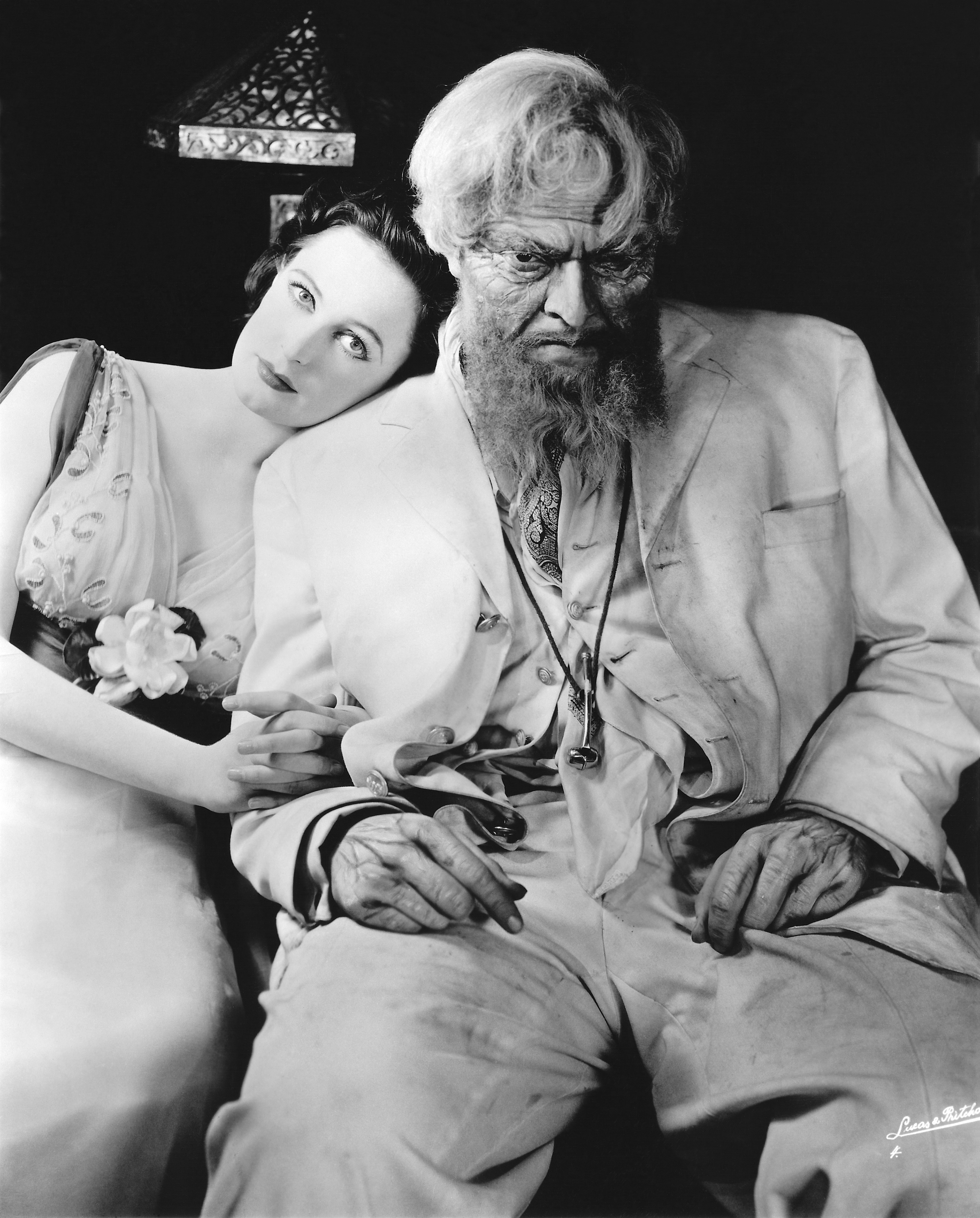
Geraldine Fitzgerald and Orson Welles in the 1938 Mercury Theatre production

Ellie Dunn, her father, and her fiancé are invited to one of Hesione Hushabye’s infamous dinner parties, to be held at the house of her father, the eccentric Captain Shotover, an inventor in his late eighties who is trying to create a "psychic ray" that will destroy dynamite. The house is built in the shape of the stern of a ship. Ariadne, Lady Utterword, Shotover's other daughter, arrives from Australia, but he pretends not to recognise her. Hesione says they are running out of money. Shotover needs to invent a weapon of mass destruction. His last invention, a lifeboat, did not bring in much cash. Ellie intends to marry a businessman, Boss Mangan, but she really loves a man she met in the National Gallery. Her fiancé is a ruthless scoundrel, her father is a bumbling prig, and it turns out that the man she is in love with is Hector, Hesione's husband, who spends his time telling romantic lies to women. Marriage to Mangan will be the sensible choice.

A burglar is captured. They say they do not want to prosecute him, but he insists he will turn himself in unless they pay him not to. It turns out that the burglar is one of Shotover's old crewmen. He confesses that he is not a real burglar. He deliberately gets himself captured to get charitable assistance from his victims. Shotover laments that the younger generation have lost their romance. Ellie suggests that she should marry Shotover, but he says he is already married to a black Jamaican wife, though it is possible she is now dead.

Ariadne says that everything will be put to rights if only they get some horses. Every English family should have horses. Mangan announces that the prime minister has asked him to join the Government "without even going through the nonsense of an election, as the dictator of a great public department". Ellie suddenly declares that she cannot marry him as she is now Shotover's "white wife". Shotover predicts that the ship of England will founder, as the captain is incapable and the crew are irresponsible:

The captain is in his bunk, drinking bottled ditch-water; and the crew is gambling in the forecastle. She will strike and sink and split. Do you think the laws of God will be suspended in favor of England because you were born in it?

A servant enters with news that an air-raid is about to happen. The lights are switched off, but Hector switches them back on to demonstrate his lack of concern about the threat. A bomb lands in the garden, blowing up Shotover's store of dynamite and killing Mangan and the burglar who were hiding there. When it is over everyone says how bored they are. They hope the bombs will come again tomorrow.

== Reception ==
In his preface to the play, published in 1919, before the first production, Shaw wrote, "Heartbreak House is not merely the name of the play which follows this preface. It is cultured, leisured Europe before the war." The writer John Sutherland describes the play as:

"a dramatized debate about an England Shaw regarded as hopelessly divided between the representatives of "Heartbreak House" (meaning the cultured but self-absorbed and politically irresponsible) and those of what his preface calls "Horseback Hall" (meaning Ariadne and the other aggressive philistines).

Sutherland calls Captain Shotover "a self-mocking portrait of Shaw himself", delivering "the key warning about the future of the ship of state".

In the preface to the play Shaw explains the subtitle, "A Fantasia in the Russian Manner", and acknowledges his debt to Chekhov, in particular to The Cherry Orchard. He writes that in comparison to another great Russian writer, Tolstoy, Chekhov was "more of a fatalist, had no faith in these charming people extricating themselves. They would, he thought, be sold up and sent adrift by the bailiffs; therefore he had no scruple in exploiting and even flattering their charm".

Critics have taken different views about Chekhov's influence on Shaw's play. Louis Kronenberger says that Shaw "turns Chekhov into a sort of literary Hyde Park soapbox dialectic for the theatre [with] none of the variety in emotional rhythm that Chekhov's has, either in tone or in profound self-revelation among the characters." Louis Crompton, in contrast, says that some critics have exalted Chekhov's detachment into an end in itself and criticised Shaw as the perverter of the master. Thomas Whitaker writes that Shaw differs markedly from Chekhov by presenting his characters as mercurial "rhetorical puppets" which gives them a "surprisingly rich vitality ... a heartbroken adolescent can instantly become a cynic on the prowl, a maternal confidante can also be a seductive hostess and an emasculating wife, a philandering lapdog can be a shrewd judge of character and an offstage hero, and a mad hatter can be a mad Lear and a mad Shaw".

== Revivals ==
=== Britain ===
Sir Barry Jackson revived the play at the Queen's Theatre, London in 1932. Two members of the original London cast – Evans and Groves – reprised their roles; Cedric Hardwicke played Shotover and Wilfrid Lawson was Mangan, O. B. Clarence was Mazzini Dunn, Leon Quartermaine was Hector, and Ballard Berkeley was Randall. A revival in March 1937 at the Westminster Theatre featured Cecil Trouncer as Shotover, Agnes Lauchlan as Ariadne, Richard Goolden as Mazzini Dunn, and Alan Napier as Hector. The author supervised the production.

In a 1943 revival at the Cambridge Theatre, London, starring Robert Donat as Shotover, Evans switched roles from her two previous productions to play Hesione; her old part as Ariadne was taken by Isabel Jeans. A 1950 production at the Arts Theatre featured Walter Fitzgerald as Shotover, Catherine Lacey as Hesione, and Patricia Jessel as Ariadne.

A 1961 revival, directed by Frank Hauser for the Oxford Playhouse, transferred to the West End at Wyndham's Theatre, starring Roger Livesey as Shotover, with Dulcie Gray as Ariadne, Michael Denison as Hector, Judy Campbell as Hesione, George Benson as Mangan. A Chichester Festival production transferred to the Lyric Theatre, London in 1967, with John Clements as Shotover, Irene Worth as Hesione, Diana Churchill as Ariadne, Bill Fraser as Mangan and Michael Aldridge as Hector.

John Schlesinger's 1975 production for the National Theatre featured Colin Blakely as Shotover, Eileen Atkins as Hesione, Anna Massey as Ariadne, Graham Crowden as Hector. Rex Harrison starred as Shotover in a 1983 revival at the Haymarket Theatre in a production directed by John Dexter, with Diana Rigg as Hesione and Rosemary Harris as Ariadne.

At the Haymarket in 1992 a production directed by Trevor Nunn starred Paul Scofield as Shotover, with Vanessa Redgrave as Hesione, Felicity Kendal as Ariadne, and Daniel Massey as Hector. A revival at the Almeida Theatre, London in 1997, directed by David Hare, starred Richard Griffiths as Shotover, Patricia Hodge as Ariadne, Penelope Wilton as Hesione, Peter McEnery as Hector and Malcolm Sinclair as Mazzini Dunn.

As part of its 50th anniversary season the Chichester Festival staged a production starring Derek Jacobi as Shotover, Sara Stewart as Ariadne, Emma Fielding as Hesione and Ronald Pickup as Mazzini Dunn.

=== North America ===
Orson Welles played Shotover in a 1938 revival by the Mercury Theatre company. Also in the cast were Mady Christians (Hesione) Vincent Price (Hector) and George Coulouris (Mangan). For a 1959 production at the Billy Rose Theatre, Maurice Evans played Shotover, with Pamela Brown as Ariadne, Diana Wynyard as Hesione, Dennis Price as Hector and Alan Webb as Mazzini Dunn. After his West End appearance as Shotover, Rex Harrison reprised the role with a cast featuring Amy Irving, Rosemary Harris, Dana Ivey and Tom Aldredge. A 2006 Broadway revival starred Philip Bosco as Shotover, with Laila Robins as Ariadne and Swoosie Kurtz as Hesione.

The play has been performed several times at the Shaw Festival in Niagara-on-the-Lake, Ontario, Canada, including a production in 1968 directed by Val Gielgud with Jessica Tandy, Paxton Whitehead, Tony Van Bridge and Frances Hyland (this production was recorded and released by Caedmon Records [Caedmon TRS-335]); then in summer 2011 directed by Christopher Newton with Michael Ball as Captain Shotover, Blair Williams as Hector, Patrick McManus as Mazzini, Laurie Paton as Ariadne, Benedict Campbell as Mangan and Robin Evans Willis as Ellie.

== Adaptations ==
=== Radio ===
BBC Radio first broadcast the play in 1951, with Milton Rosmer as Shotover. A second radio adaptation was broadcast in 1955 with Stephen Murray as Shotover. In 1968 the BBC broadcast a new adaptation, starring Ralph Richardson as Shotover, with Edith Evans reprising her original 1921 role of Ariadne and Elizabeth Sellars as Hesione. A 1998 BBC production starred John Wood as Shotover, Cheryl Campbell as Ariadne and Eleanor Bron as Hesione.

=== Television ===
The first BBC television broadcast of Heartbreak House was in 1958, with Mark Dignam as Shotover, Diana Churchill as Ariadne, Judy Campbell as Hesione and Tony Britton as Hector. A 1977 BBC adaptation starred John Gielgud as Shotover, Barbara Murray as Ariadne and Siân Phillips as Hesione.

== Awards and nominations ==
=== 1983 Broadway revival ===
Year	Award	Category	Nominee	Result
1984	Tony Award	Best Revival		Nominated
1984	Tony Award	Best Actor in a Play	Rex Harrison	Nominated
1984	Tony Award	Best Actress in a Play	Rosemary Harris	Nominated
1984	Tony Award	Best Featured Actor in a Play	Philip Bosco	Nominated
1984	Tony Award	Best Featured Actress in a Play	Dana Ivey	Nominated
1984	Tony Award	Best Costume Design	Jane Greenwood	Nominated

=== 2006 Broadway revival ===
Year	Award	Category	Nominee	Result
2007	Tony Award	Best Actress in a Play	Swoosie Kurtz	Nominated
2007	Tony Award	Best Costume Design of a Play	Jane Greenwood	Nominated

== Sources ==
- Crompton, Louis (1969). Shaw the Dramatist. Lincoln: University of Nebraska. OCLC 4046.
- Holroyd, Michael (1997). Bernard Shaw: The One-Volume Definitive Edition. London: Chatto & Windus. ISBN 978-0-7011-6279-5.
- Kronenberger, Louis (1953). George Bernard Shaw: A Critical Survey. Cleveland: World Publishing. OCLC 796547.
- MacCarthy, Desmond (1973) [1951]. Shaw: The Plays. Newton Abbot: David and Charles. ISBN 0-7153-6312-3.
- Parker, John, ed. (1922). Who's Who in the Theatre (fourth ed.). London: Sir Isaac Pitman and Sons. OCLC 473894893.
- Shaw, Bernard (1919). Heartbreak House. London: Constable. OCLC 1440315126.
- Wearing, J. P. (2014). The London Stage, 1920–1929 (second ed.). Lanham: Rowman and Littlefield. ISBN 978-0-8108-9301-6.
- Weintraub, Stanley (1989). Bernard Shaw on the London Art Scene, 1885–1950. State College: Pennsylvania State University Press. ISBN 978-0-27-100665-9.
- Whitaker, Thomas (1977). Fields of Play in Modern Drama. Princeton: Princeton University Press. ISBN 0-69-106333-8.
