= Puppetry =

Form of theatre or performance that involves the manipulation of puppets

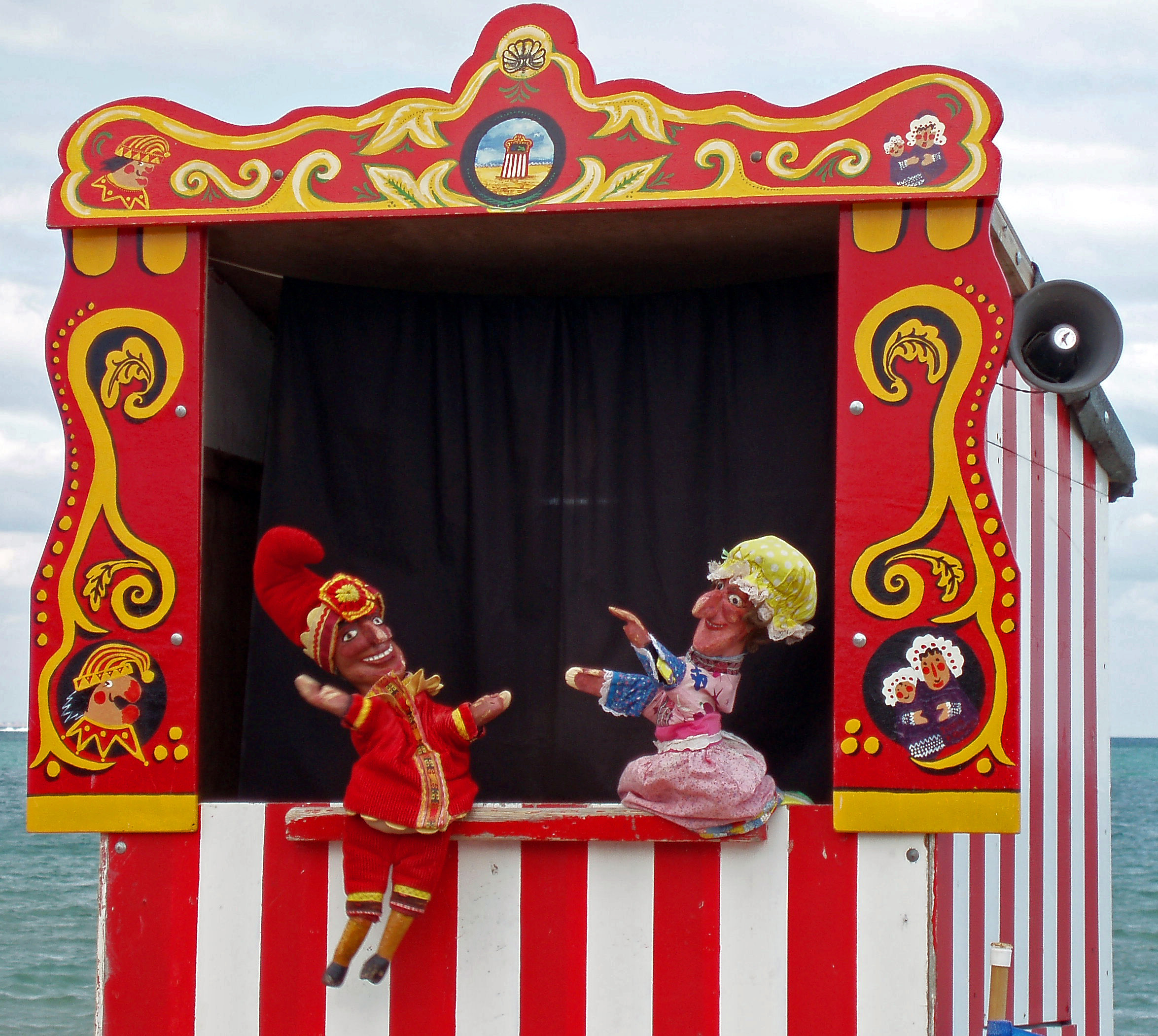
- Punch & Judy puppet show at Swanage, Dorset, England
- Ancestor arts: Theatre
- Originating era: 3000 BC

Puppetry is a form of theatre or performance that involves the manipulation of puppets, the inanimate objects, often resembling some type of human or animal figure, that are animated or manipulated by a human called a puppeteer. Such a performance is also known as a puppet production. The script for a puppet production is called a puppet play. Puppeteers use movements from hands and arms to control devices such as rods or strings to move the body, head, limbs, and in some cases the mouth and eyes of the puppet. The puppeteer sometimes speaks in the voice of the character of the puppet, while at other times they perform to a recorded soundtrack.

There are many different varieties of puppets, and they are made of a wide range of materials, depending on their form and intended use. They can be extremely complex or very simple in their construction. The simplest puppets are finger puppets, which are tiny puppets that fit onto a single finger, and sock puppets, which are formed from a sock and operated by inserting one's hand inside the sock, with the opening and closing of the hand simulating the movement of the puppet's "mouth". A hand puppet or glove puppet is controlled by one hand which occupies the interior of the puppet and moves the puppet around. Punch and Judy puppets are familiar examples. Other hand or glove puppets are larger and require two puppeteers for each puppet. Japanese bunraku puppets are an example of this. Marionettes are suspended and controlled by a number of strings, plus sometimes a central rod attached to a control bar held from above by the puppeteer. Rod puppets are made from a head attached to a central rod. Over the rod is a body form with arms attached controlled by separate rods. They have more movement possibilities as a consequence than a simple hand or glove puppet.

Puppetry is a very ancient form of theatre which was first recorded in the 5th century BC in Ancient Greece. Some forms of puppetry may have originated as long ago as 3000 years BCE. Puppetry takes many forms, but they all share the process of animating inanimate performing objects to tell a story. Puppetry occurs in almost all human societies, where puppets are used for the purpose of entertainment through performance, as sacred objects in rituals, as symbolic effigies in celebrations such as carnivals, and as a catalyst for social and psychological change in transformative arts.

== History ==
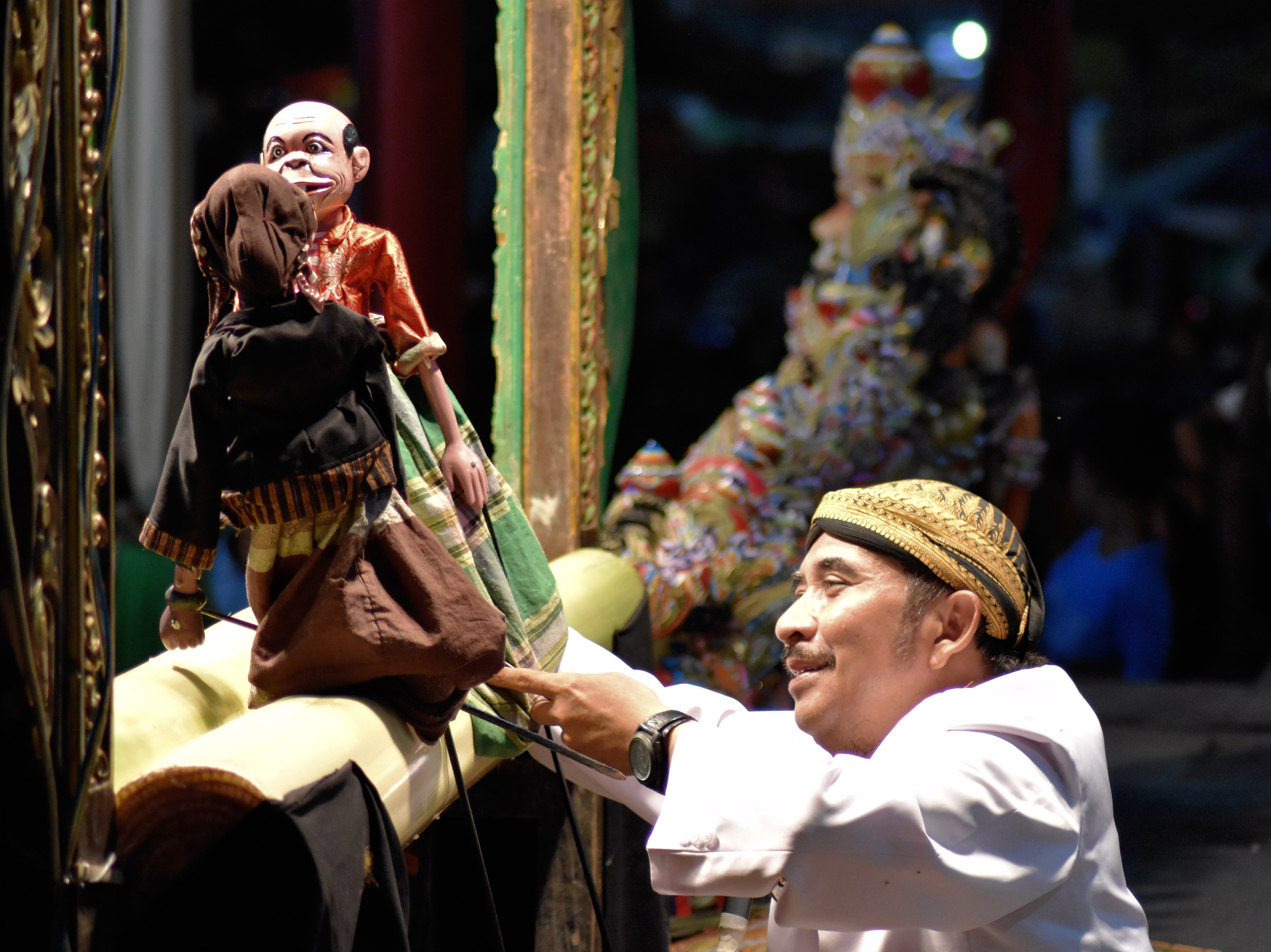
A wayang golek wooden puppet performance in Indonesia

Puppetry is a very ancient art form, thought to have originated about 4000 years ago. Puppets have been used since the earliest times to animate and communicate the ideas and needs of human societies. Some historians claim that they pre-date actors in theatre. There is evidence that they were used in Egypt as early as 2000 BCE when string-operated figures of wood were manipulated to perform the action of kneading bread. Wire controlled, articulated puppets made of clay and ivory have also been found in Egyptian tombs. Hieroglyphs also describe "walking statues" being used in ancient Egyptian religious dramas. Puppetry was practiced in ancient Greece and the oldest written records of puppetry can be found in the works of Herodotus and Xenophon, dating from the 5th century BC.

=== Africa ===
Sub-Saharan Africa may have inherited some of the puppet traditions of ancient Egypt. Certainly, secret societies in many African ethnic groups still use puppets in ritual dramas as well as in their healing and hunting ceremonies. Today, puppetry continues as a popular form, often within a ceremonial context, and as part of a wide range of folk forms including dance, storytelling, and masked performance. In the 2010s throughout rural Africa, puppetry still performed the function of transmitting cultural values and ideas that in large African cities is increasingly undertaken by formal education, books, cinema, and television.

=== Asia ===
==== East Asia ====
China has a history of puppetry dating back 3000 years, originally in pi-yung xi, the "theatre of the lantern shadows", or as it is more commonly known today, Chinese shadow theatre. By the Song dynasty (960–1279 AD), puppets played to all social classes including the courts, yet puppeteers, as in Europe, were considered to be from a lower social stratum. Glove puppetry, a variant of hand puppet theatre originating in Fujian and popular in Taiwan, is performed with puppeteers working behind or beneath the stage.

Japan has many forms of puppetry, including the bunraku. Bunraku developed out of Shinto temple rites and gradually became a highly sophisticated form of puppetry. Chikamatsu Monzaemon, considered by many to be Japan's greatest playwright, gave up writing kabuki plays and focused exclusively on the puppet-only bunraku plays. Initially consisting of one puppeteer, by 1730 three puppeteers were used to operate each puppet in full view of the audience. The puppeteers, who dressed all in black, would become invisible when standing against a black background, while the torches illuminated only the carved, painted and costumed wooden puppets.

Korea's tradition of puppetry is thought to have come from China. The oldest historical evidence of puppetry in Korea comes from a letter written in 982 A.D. from Choe Seung-roe to the King. In Korean, the word for puppet is Kkoktugakshi. Gagsi means a "bride" or a "young woman", which was the most common form the dolls took. A kkoktugakshi puppet play has eight scenes.

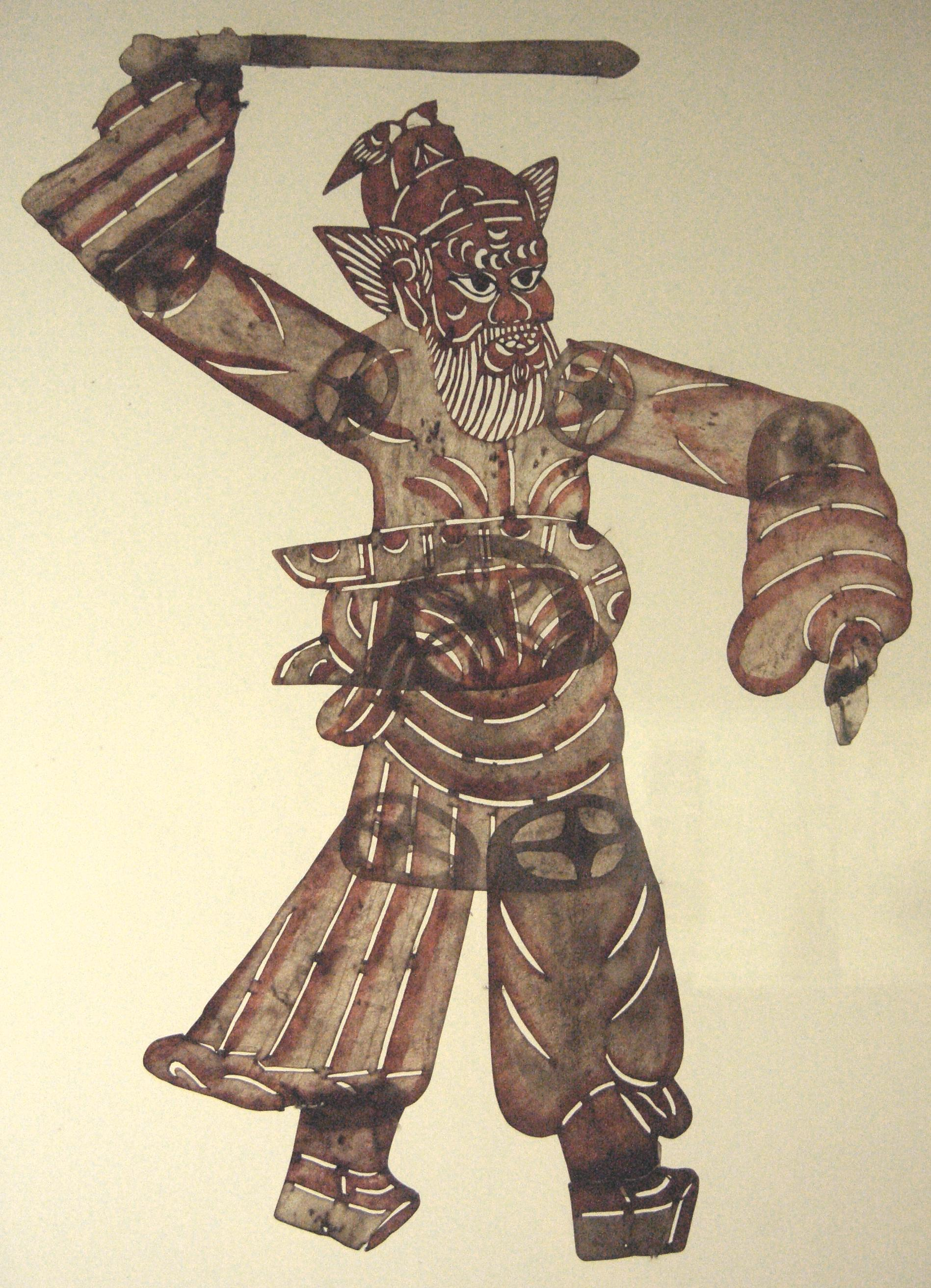
Chinese shadow puppet (Beijing style)

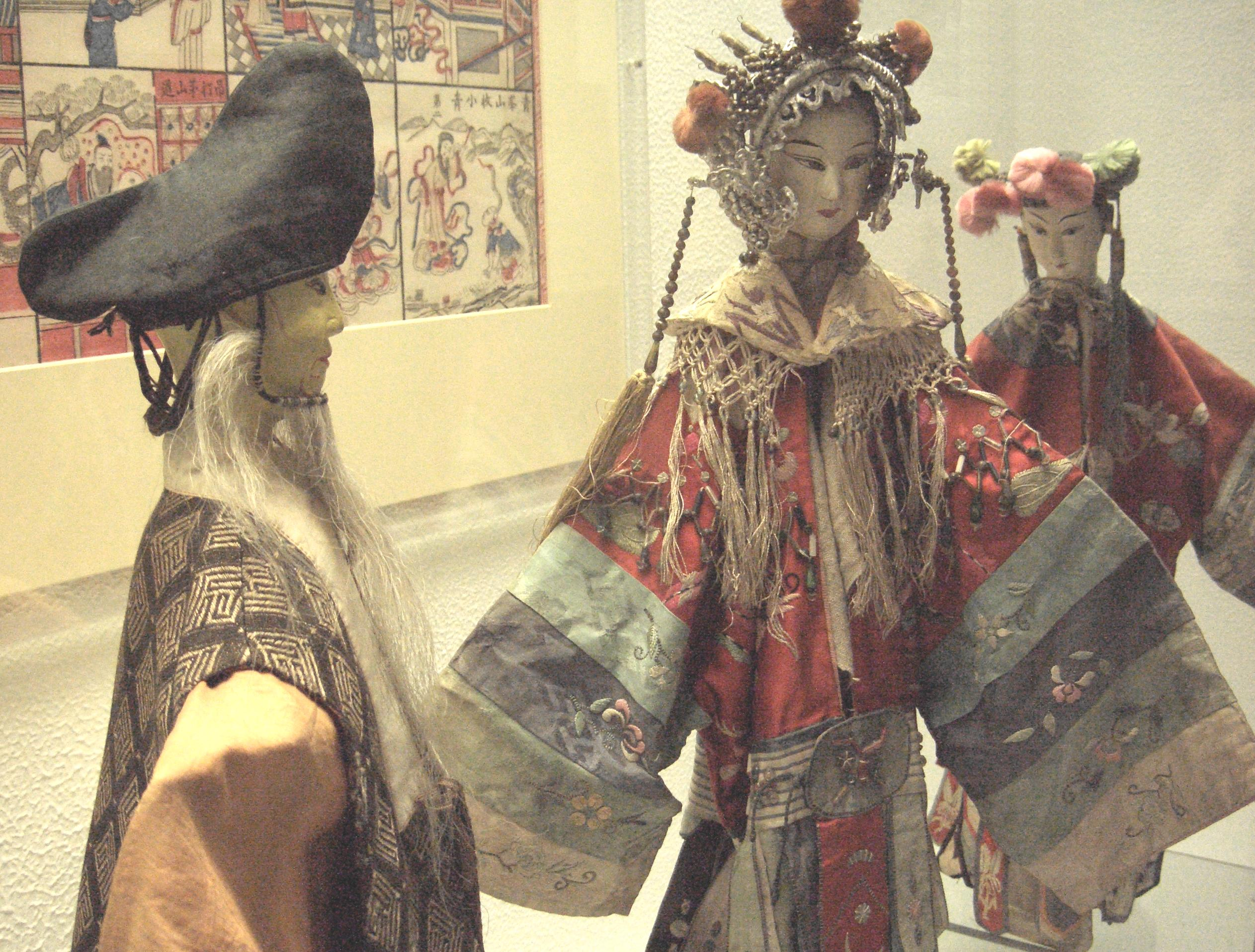
Chinese stick puppets

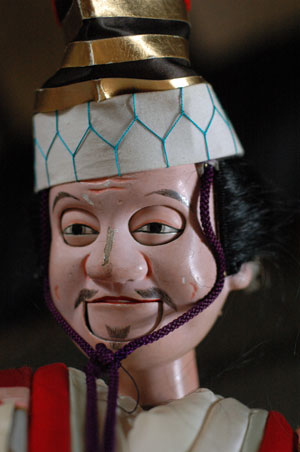
Sanbaso bunraku puppet, Tonda Puppet Troupe, Japan

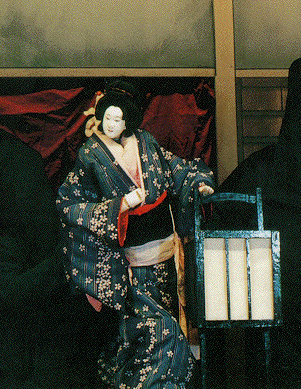
The character Osono from the play Hade Sugata Onna Maiginu (Note: in a performance by the Tonda Puppet Troupe of Nagahama, Shiga, Japan - an example of Japanese bunraku puppetry)

==== Southeast Asia ====
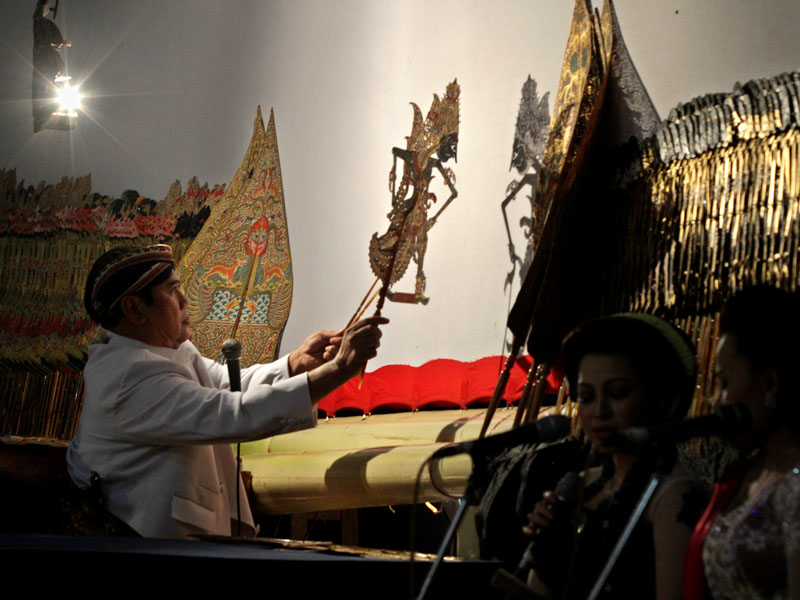
Wayang Kulit Show, There are three main components of Wayang Kulit show including Dalang, Gamelan (Music and Sindhen), and Wayang Kulit itself

The Indonesian wayang theater was influenced by Indian traditions. Some scholars trace the origin of puppets to India 4000 years ago, where the main character in Sanskrit plays was known as Sutradhara, "the holder of strings". Wayang is a strong tradition of puppetry native to Indonesia, especially in Java and Bali. In Java, wayang kulit, an elaborate form of shadow puppetry, is very popular. Javanese rod puppets have a long history and are used to tell fables from Javanese history. Another popular puppetry form in Indonesia is wayang golek.

Thailand has hun krabok, a popular form of rod puppet theatre.

Vietnam developed the art form of water puppetry, unique to that country. The puppets are built out of wood and the shows are performed in a waist-high pool. A large rod under the water is used by puppeteers to support and control the puppets, creating the appearance of the puppets moving over water. The origin of this form of puppetry dates back 700 years when the rice fields would flood and the villagers would entertain each other. Puppet show competitions between Vietnamese villages eventually led to the creation of secretive and exclusive puppet societies.

The Philippines first developed its art of puppetry during the Spanish colonial period. The oldest known Filipino puppetry is the carrillo, also known as kikimut, titire, and potei. It was first recorded in 1879. It involves small carts used in puppet plays with figures made of cardboard utilized for shadow plays. In the late 1800s, another Filipino puppetry developed. Higantes are giant papier-mâché puppets paraded through town during the Higantes Festival. These puppets are made as a devotion to San Clemente and as a mockery against colonial-era land owners who discriminated against Filipinos. Various traditions are connected with the higantes. Since the 20th century, multiple puppet arts have developed in the Philippines. A notable Filipino puppeteer is Amelia Lapeña Bonifacio.

In Burma, today called Myanmar, an elaborate form of puppet shows, called Yoke thé, evolved, based on royal patronage. The probable date of the origin of Burmese marionettes is given as around 1780, during the reign of King Singu Min, and their introduction is credited to the Minister of Royal Entertainment, U Thaw. From their inception, marionettes enjoyed great popularity in the courts of the Konbaung dynasty. Little has changed since the creation of the art by U Thaw, and the set of characters developed by him is still in use today.

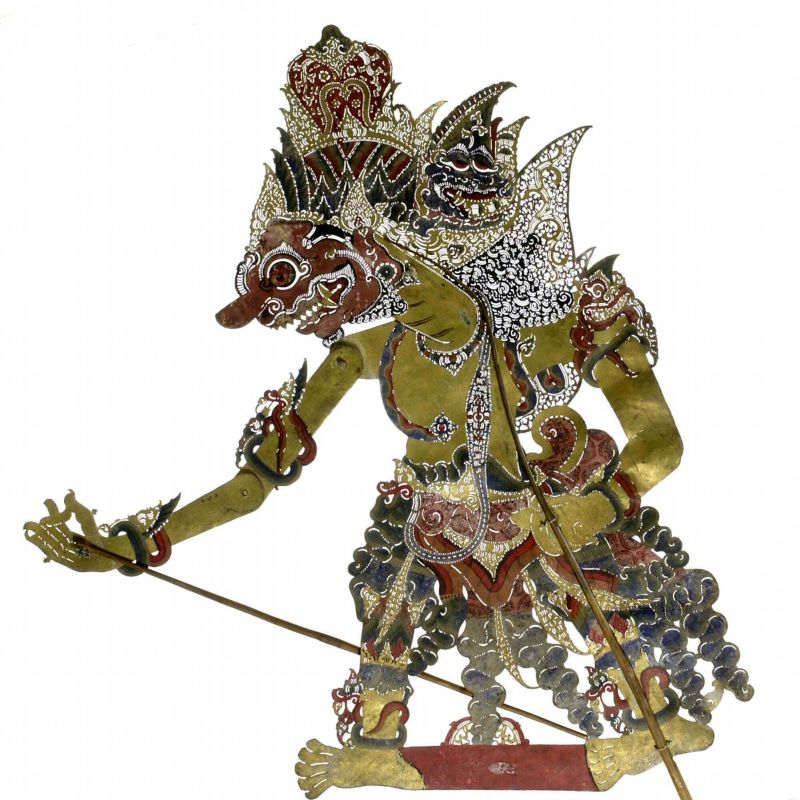
Wayang Kulit (Shadow Puppet) Kumbakarna, Tropenmuseum Collections, Indonesia, before 1914

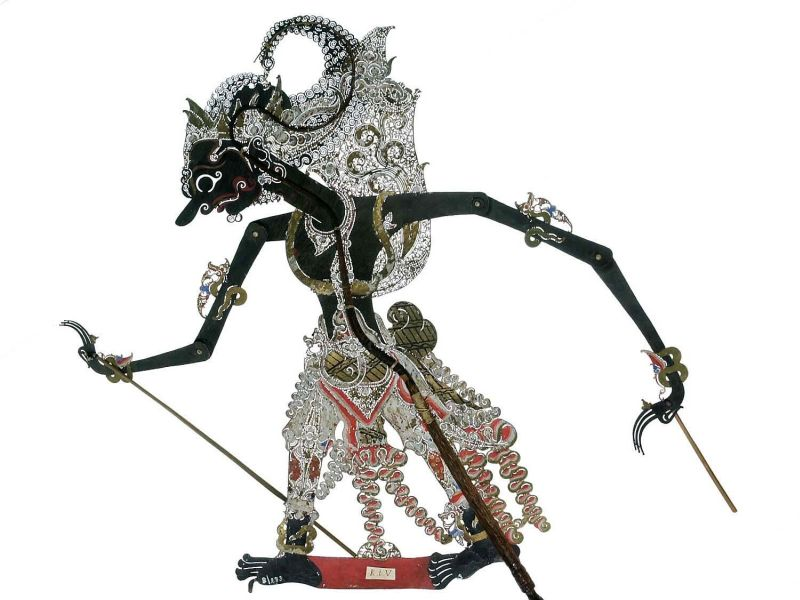
Wayang Kulit (Shadow Puppet) Gatot Kaca, Tropenmuseum Collections, Indonesia, before 1914

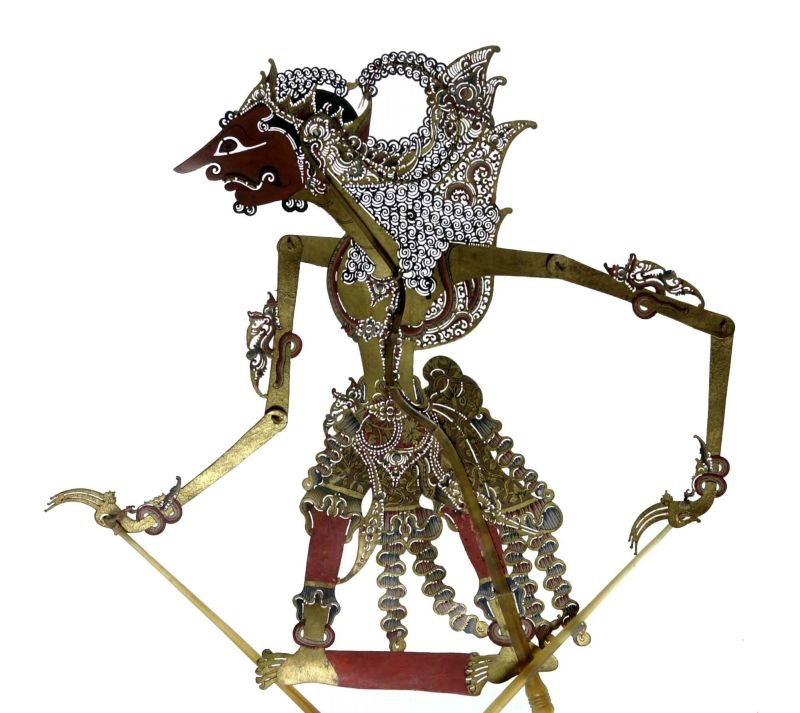
Wayang Kulit (Shadow Puppet) Wibisana, Tropenmuseum Collections, Indonesia before 1933

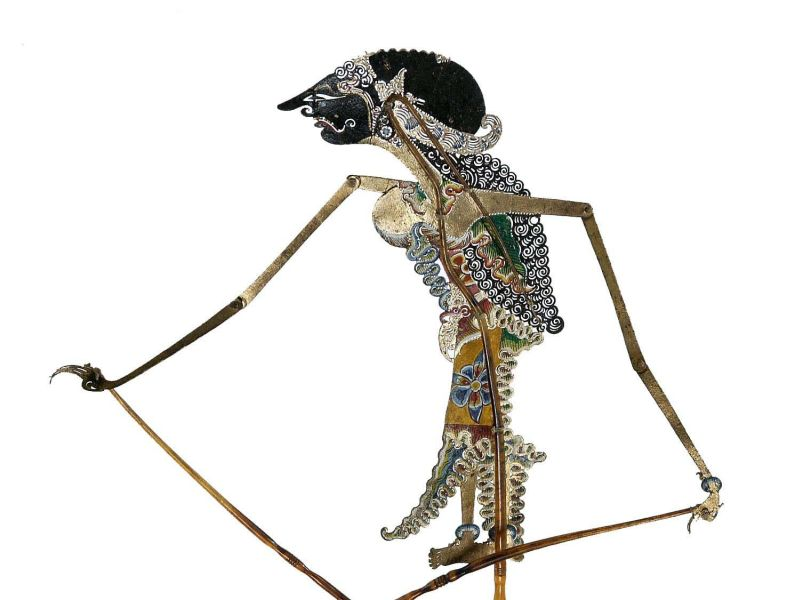
Wayang Kulit (Shadow Puppet) Princess Shinta, Tropenmuseum Collections, Indonesia before 1983

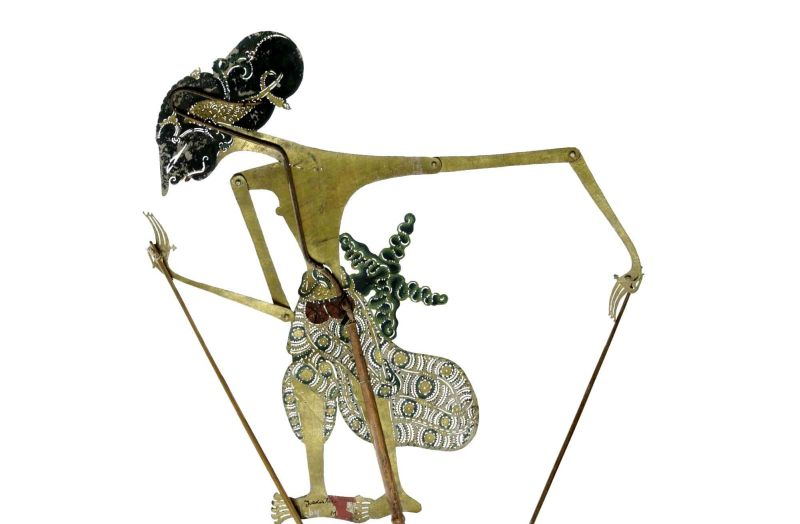
Wayang Kulit (Shadow Puppet) Yudhishthira, Tropenmuseum Collections, Indonesia before 1914

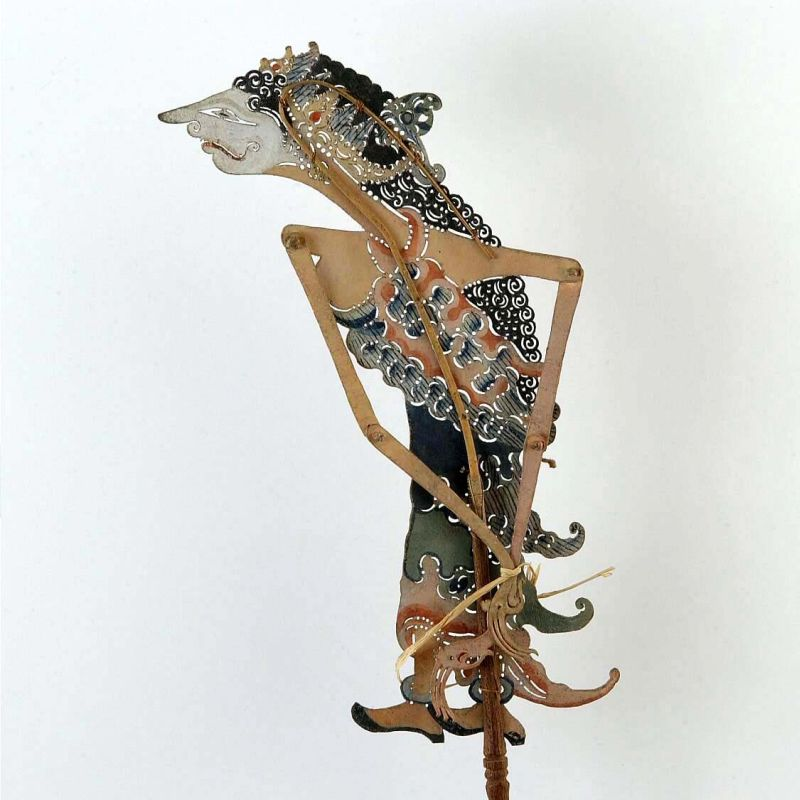
Wayang Kulit (Shadow Puppet) Princess Tari, Tropenmuseum Collections, Indonesia before 1934

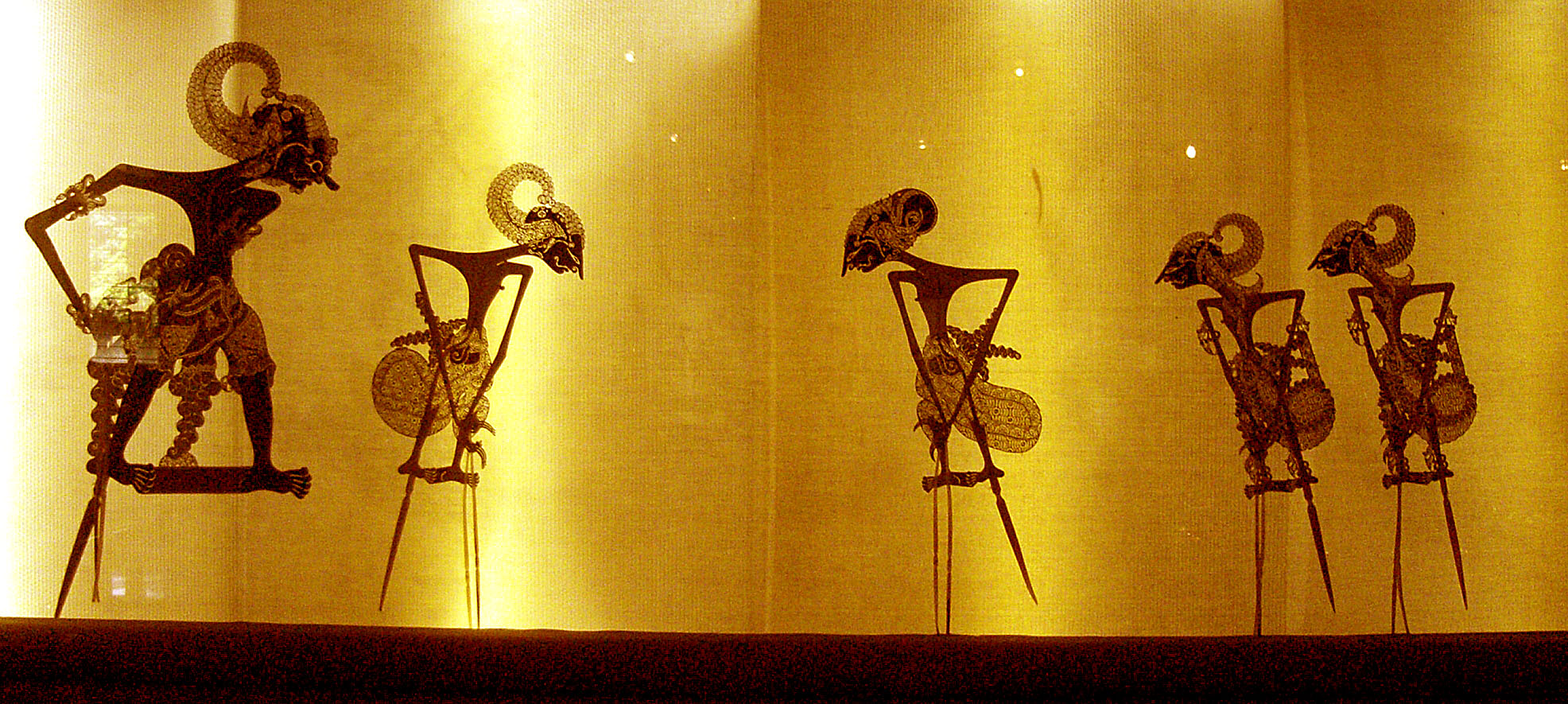
Wayang kulit, a puppet-shadow play of Java, Bali, and Lombok from Indonesia

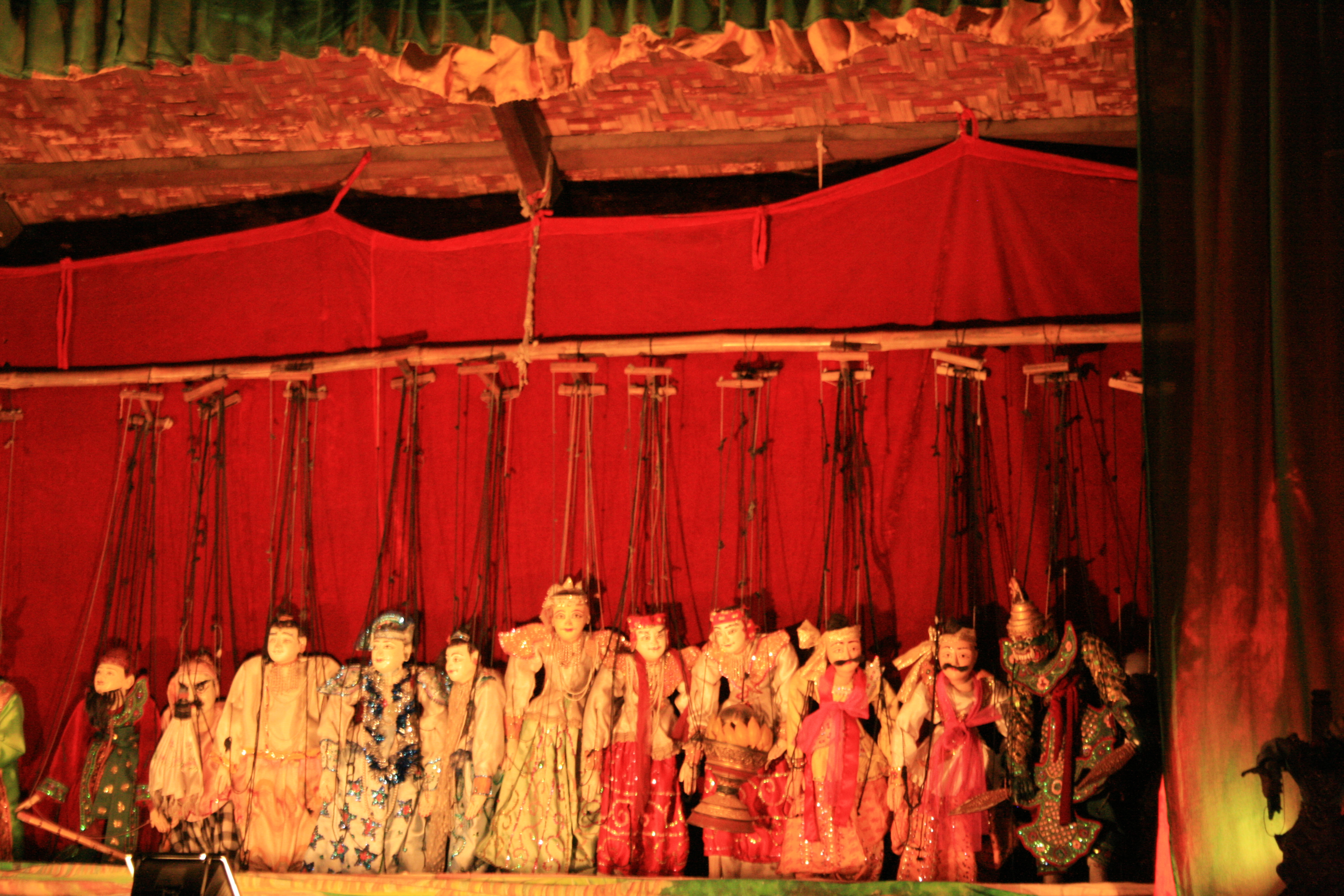
Yoke thé puppets, depicting royal patronage, from Myanmar

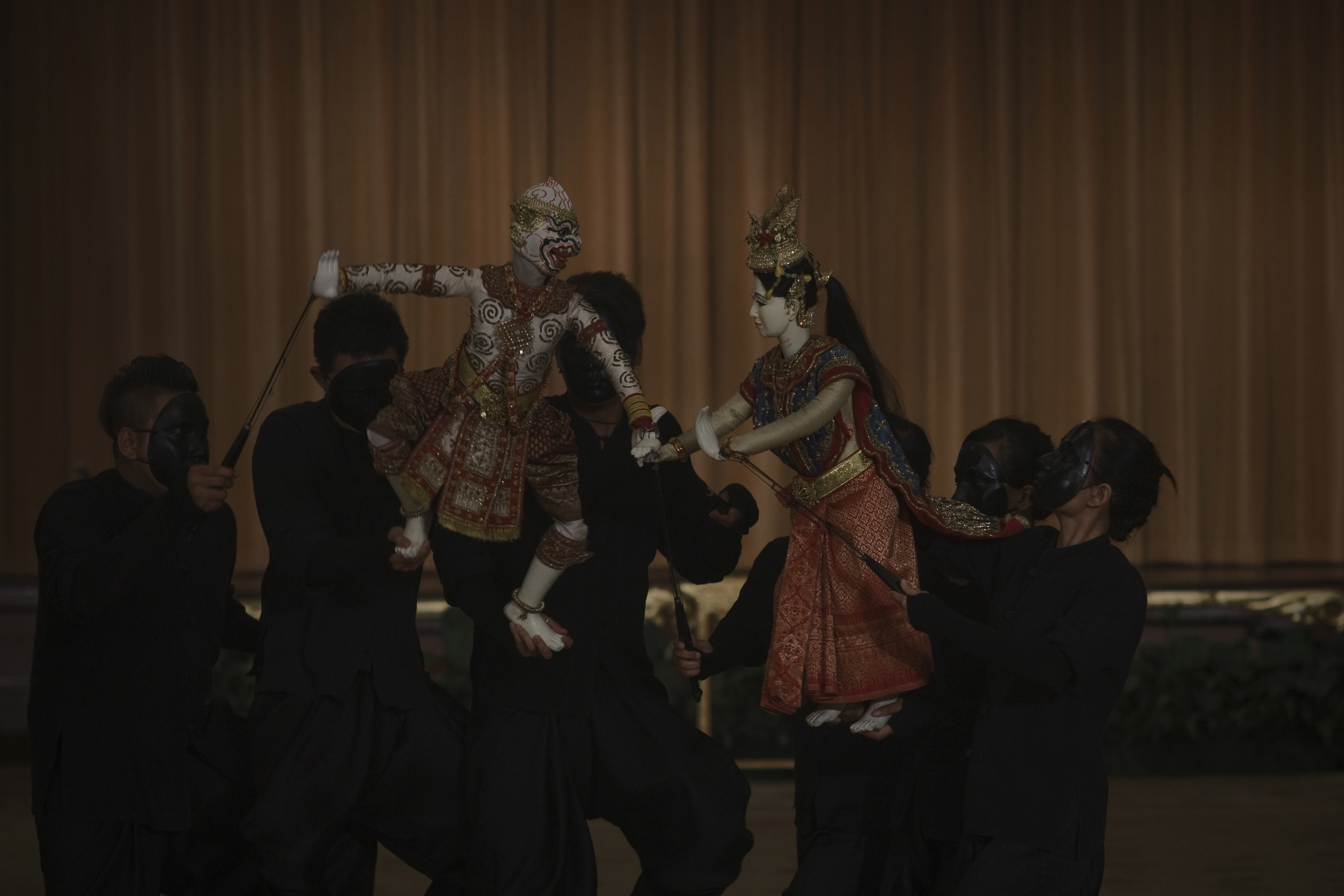
Hun krabok, puppets handled by three performers from Thailand

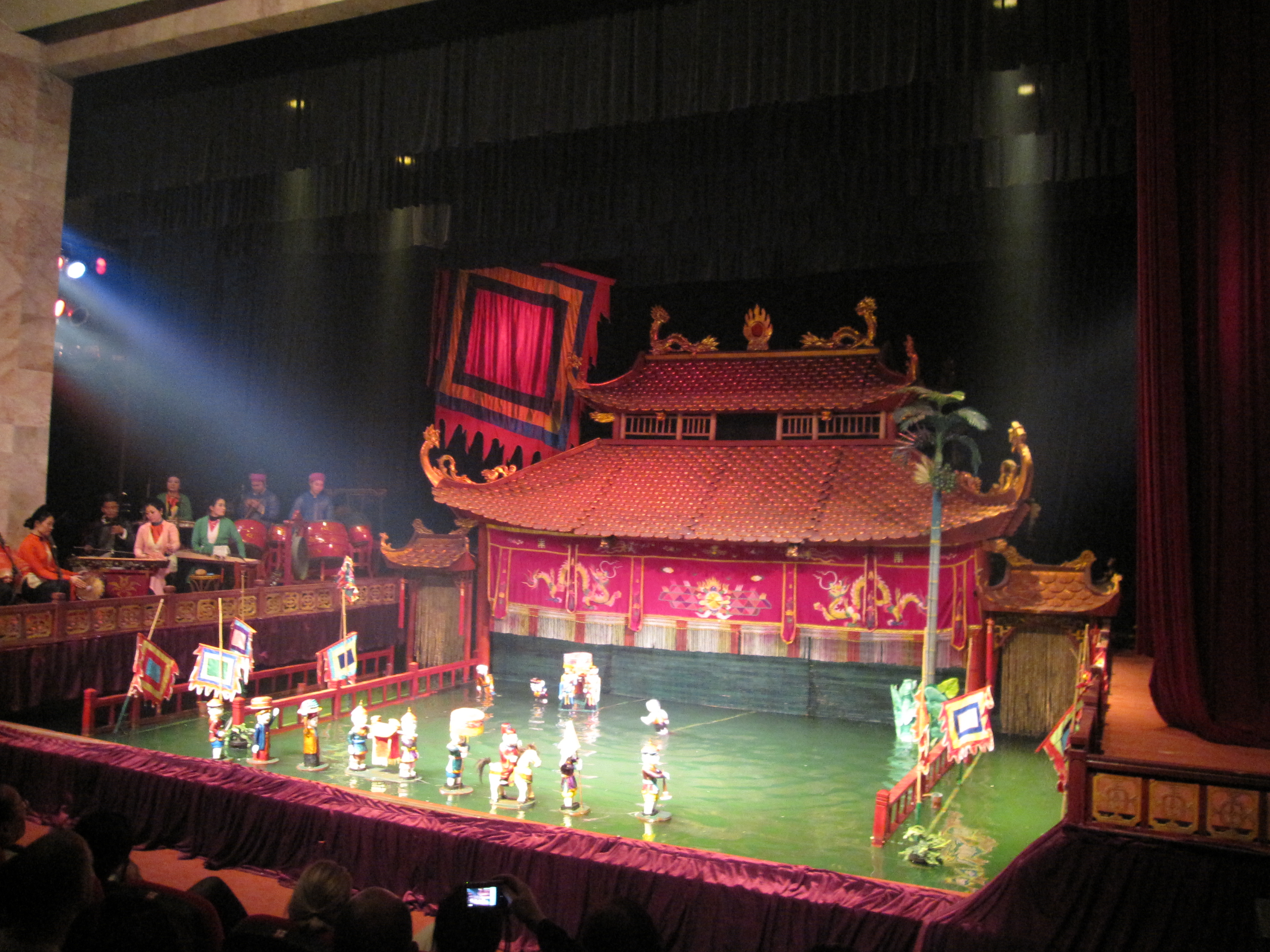
Water puppetry, a unique art originating from Vietnam

==== India ====
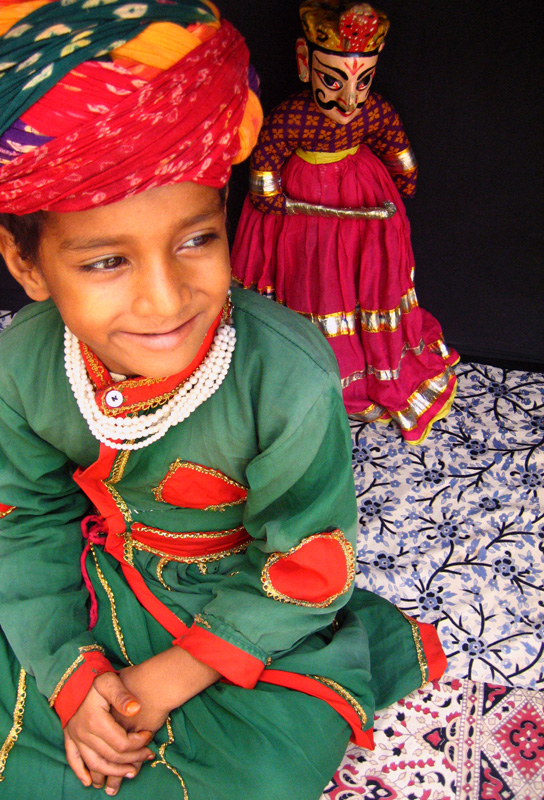
Kathputli Puppeteer from Rajasthan, India

India has a long tradition of puppetry. In the ancient Indian epic Mahabharata there are references to puppets. Another ancient reference to puppetry is found in Tamil classic 'Silappadikaaram' written around 1st or 2nd century B.C. Kathputli, a form of string puppet performance native to Rajasthan, is notable and there are many Indian ventriloquists and puppeteers. The first Indian ventriloquist, Professor Y. K. Padhye, introduced this form of puppetry to India in the 1920s and his son, Ramdas Padhye, subsequently popularised ventriloquism and puppetry. Almost all types of puppets are found in India.

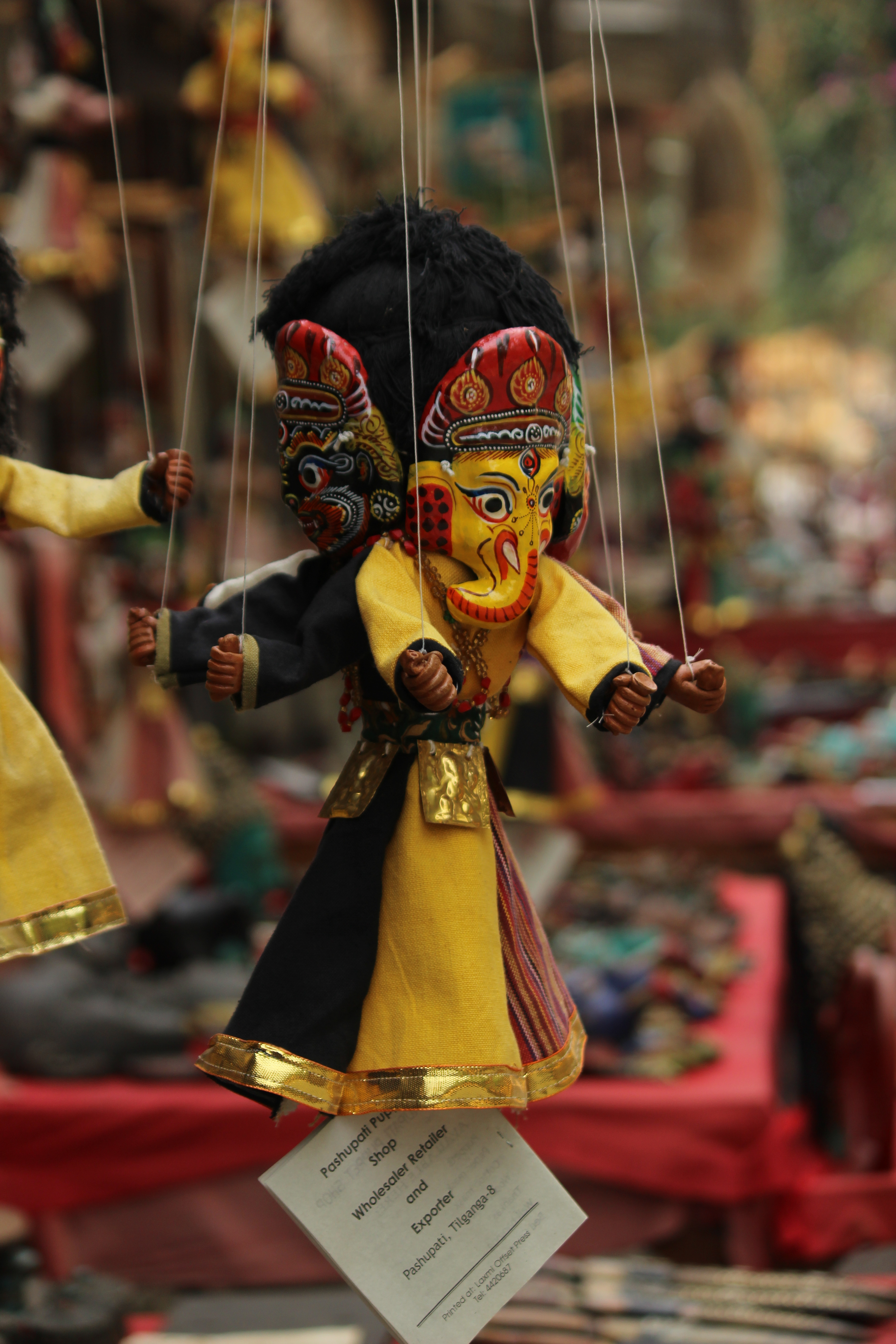
The Ganesh: a puppet from Nepal

There is evidence for puppetry in the Indus Valley civilization. Archaeologists have unearthed one terracotta doll with a detachable head capable of manipulation by a string dating to 2500 BC. Another figure is a terracotta monkey which could be manipulated up and down a stick, achieving minimum animation in both cases. Puppets are described in the epic Mahabharata, Tamil literature from the Sangam era, and various literary works dating from the late centuries BC to the early centuries AD, including the Edicts of Ashoka. Works like the Natya Shastra and the Kama Sutra elaborate on puppetry in some detail.

===== String puppets =====
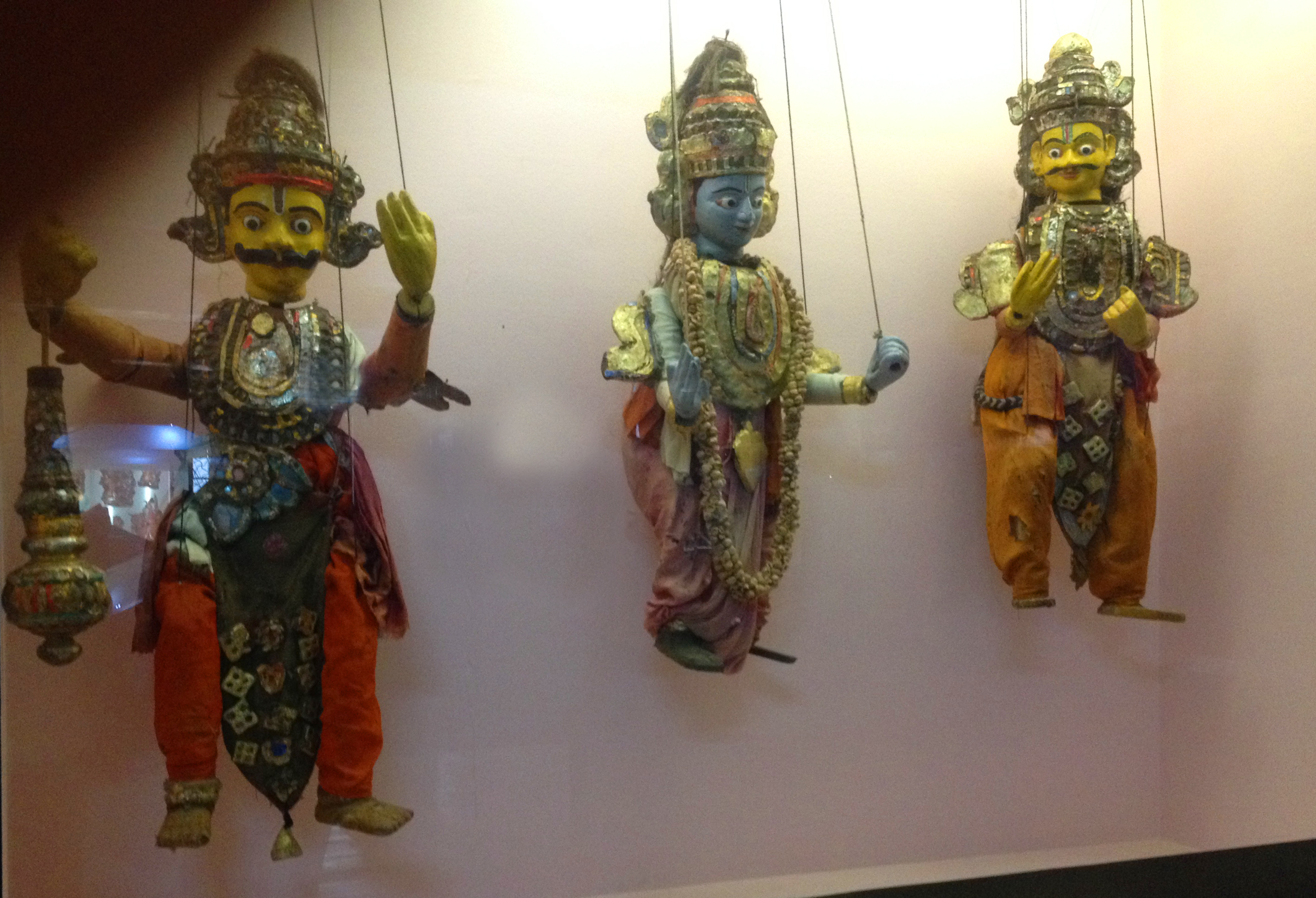
Sakhi Kandhei (String puppets of Odisha)

India has an ancient tradition of string puppets or marionettes. Marionettes with jointed limbs controlled by strings allow far greater flexibility and are therefore the most articulate of the puppets. Rajasthan, Orissa, Karnataka and Tamil Nadu are some of the regions where this form of puppetry has flourished. The traditional marionettes of Rajasthan are known as Kathputli. Carved from a single piece of wood, these puppets are like large dolls that are colourfully dressed. The string puppets of Orissa are known as Kundhei. The string puppets of Karnataka are called Gombeyatta. Puppets from Tamil Nadu, known as Bommalattam, combine the techniques of rod and string puppets.

===== Shadow puppets =====
Shadow puppets are an ancient part of India's culture and art, particularly regionally as the keelu bomme and Tholu bommalata of Andhra Pradesh, the Togalu gombeyaata in Karnataka, the charma bahuli natya in Maharashtra, the Ravana chhaya in Odisha, the Tholpavakoothu in Kerala and the thol bommalatta in Tamil Nadu. Shadow puppet play is also found in pictorial traditions in India, such as temple mural painting, loose-leaf folio paintings, and the narrative paintings. Dance forms such as the Chhau of Odisha literally mean "shadow". The shadow theatre dance drama theatre are usually performed on platform stages attached to Hindu temples, and in some regions these are called Koothu Madams or Koothambalams. In many regions, the puppet drama play is performed by itinerant artist families on temporary stages during major temple festivals. Legends from the Hindu epics Ramayana and the Mahabharata dominate their repertoire. However, the details and the stories vary regionally.

During the 19th century and early parts of the 20th century of the colonial era, Indologists believed that shadow puppet plays had become extinct in India, though mentioned in its ancient Sanskrit texts. In the 1930s and thereafter, states Stuart Blackburn, these fears of its extinction were found to be false as evidence emerged that shadow puppetry had remained a rural tradition in central Kerala mountains, most of Karnataka, northern Andhra Pradesh, parts of Tamil Nadu, Odisha and southern Maharashtra. The Marathi people, particularly of low caste, had preserved and performed the legends of Hindu epics as a folk tradition. The importance of Marathi artists is evidenced, states Blackburn, from the puppeteers speaking Marathi as their mother tongue in many non-Marathi speaking states of India.

A shadow play in Kerala
Ramayana legend, with audience response (45 seconds)

According to Beth Osnes, the tholu bommalata shadow puppet theatre dates back to the 3rd century BCE. The puppets used in a tholu bommalata performance, states Phyllis Dircks, are "translucent, lusciously multicolored leather figures four to five feet tall, and feature one or two articulated arms". The process of making the puppets is an elaborate ritual, where the artist families in India pray, go into seclusion, produce the required art work, then celebrate the "metaphorical birth of a puppet" with flowers and incense.

The tholu pava koothu of Kerala uses leather puppets whose images are projected on a backlit screen. The shadows are used to creatively express characters and stories in the Ramayana. A complete performance of the epic can take forty-one nights, while an abridged performance lasts as few as seven days. One feature of the tholu pava koothu show is that it is a team performance of puppeteers, while other shadow plays such as the wayang of Indonesia are performed by a single puppeteer for the same Ramayana story. There are regional differences within India in the puppet arts. For example, women play a major role in shadow play theatre in most parts of India, except in Kerala and Maharashtra. Almost everywhere, except Odisha, the puppets are made from tanned deer skin, painted and articulated. Translucent leather puppets are typical in Andhra Pradesh and Tamil Nadu, while opaque puppets are typical in Kerala and Odisha. The artist troupes typically carry over a hundred puppets for their performance in rural India.

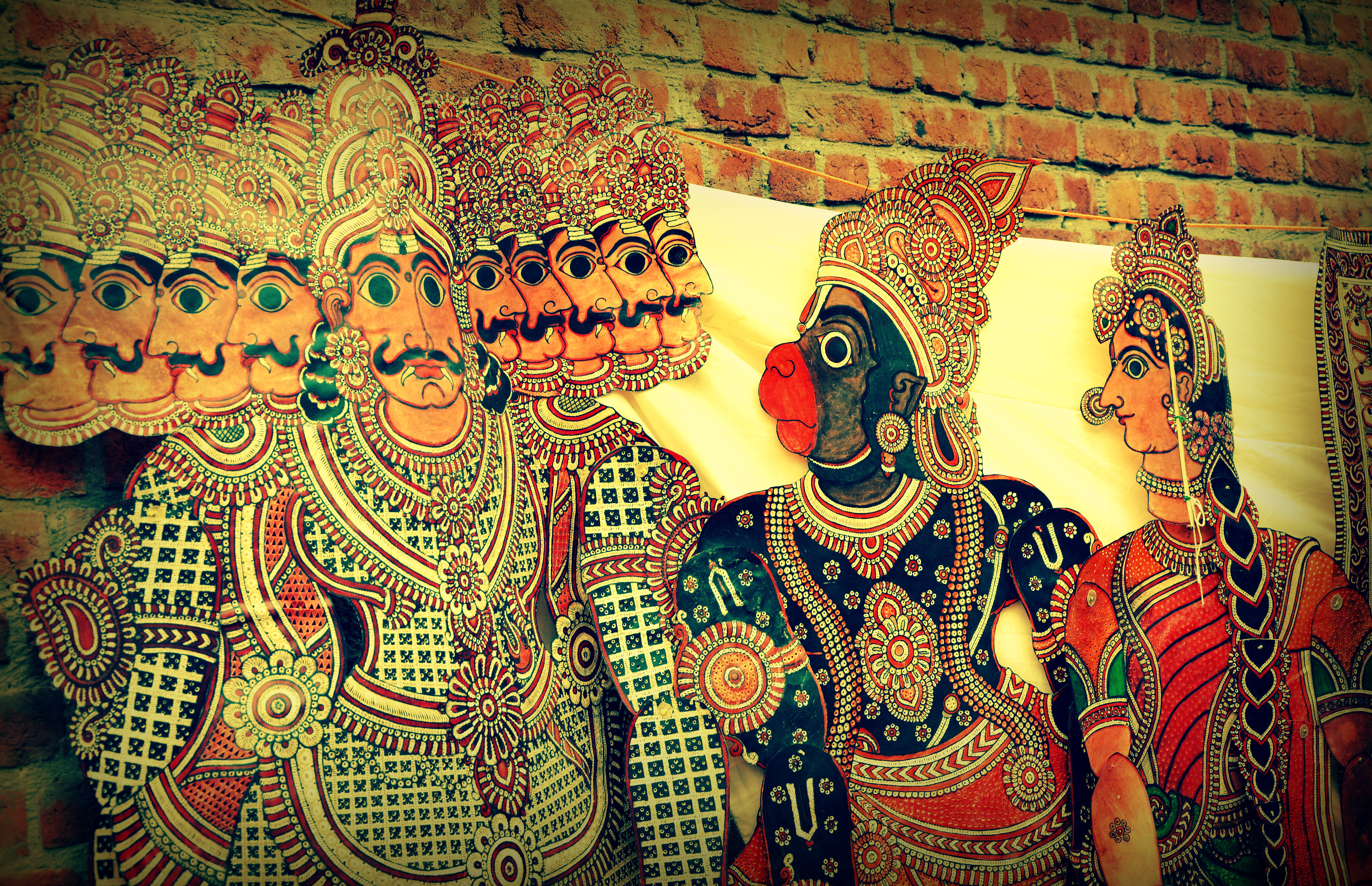
Hanuman and Ravana in Togalu Gombeyaata, a shadow puppet tradition in the southern part of India

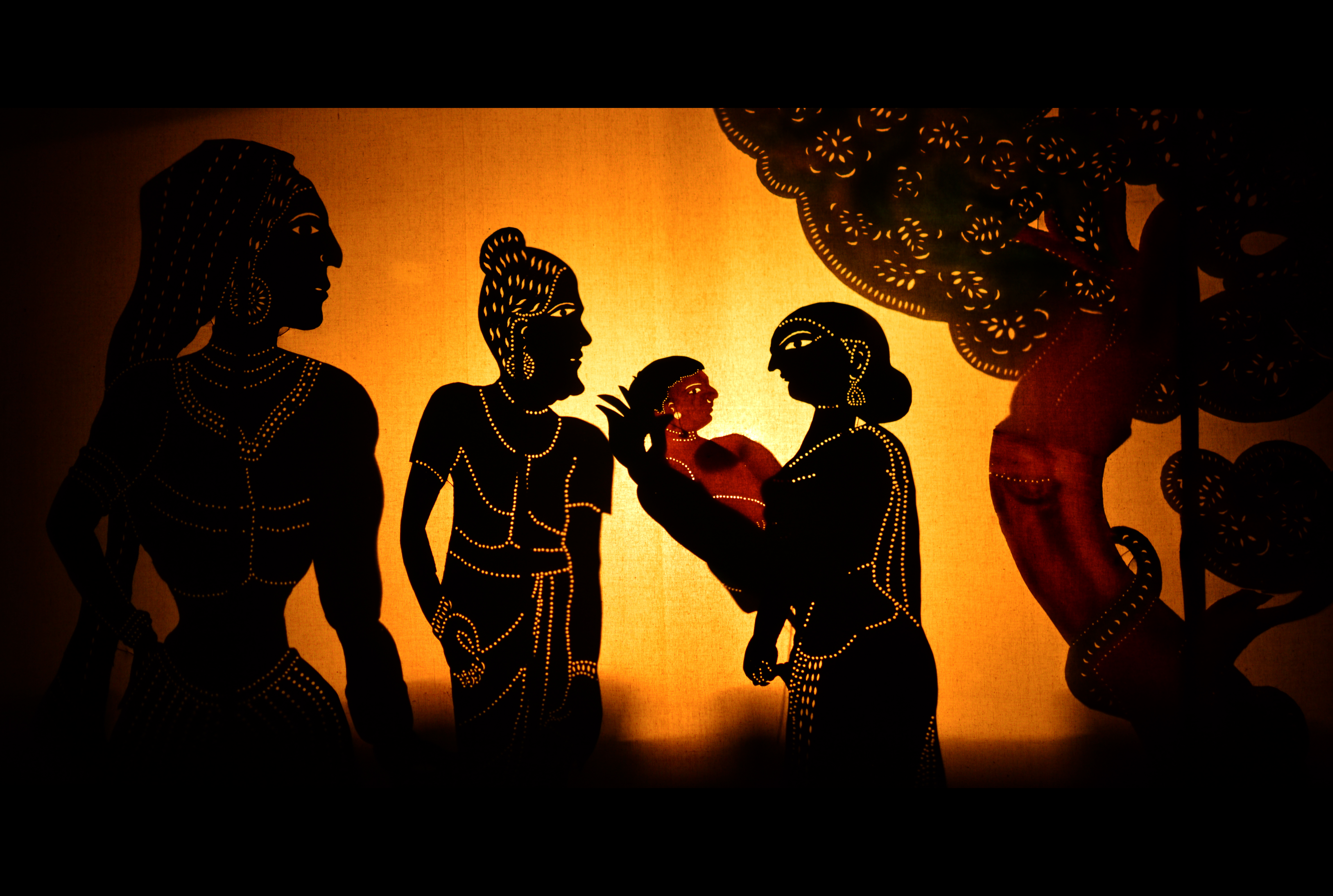
A scene from Tholpavakoothu shadow play.

===== Rod puppets =====
Rod puppets are an extension of glove-puppets, but are often much larger and supported and manipulated by rods from below. This form of puppetry now is found mostly in West Bengal and Orissa. The traditional rod puppet form of West Bengal is known as Putul Nautch. They are carved from wood and follow the various artistic styles of a particular region. The traditional rod puppet of Bihar is known as Yampuri.

===== Glove puppets =====
Glove puppets are also known as sleeve, hand or palm puppets. The head is made of either papier-mâché, cloth or wood, with two hands emerging from just below the neck. The rest of the figure consists of a long, flowing skirt. These puppets are like limp dolls, but in the hands of an able puppeteer, are capable of producing a wide range of movements. The manipulation technique is simple the movements are controlled by the human hand, the first finger inserted in the head and the middle finger and the thumb in the two arms of the puppet. With the help of these three fingers, the glove puppet comes alive.

The tradition of glove puppets in India is popular in Uttar Pradesh, Orissa, West Bengal and Kerala. In Uttar Pradesh, glove puppet plays usually present social themes, whereas in Orissa such plays are based on stories of Radha and Krishna. In Orissa, the puppeteer plays a dholak (hand drum) with one hand and manipulates the puppet with the other. The delivery of the dialogue, the movement of the puppet and the beat of the dholak are well synchronised and create a dramatic atmosphere. In Kerala, the traditional glove puppet play is called Pavakoothu.

==== Afghanistan ====
Afghanistan has produced a form of puppetry known as buz-baz. During a performance a puppeteer will simultaneously operate a marionette of a markhor while playing a dambura (long-necked lute).

=== West Asia ===
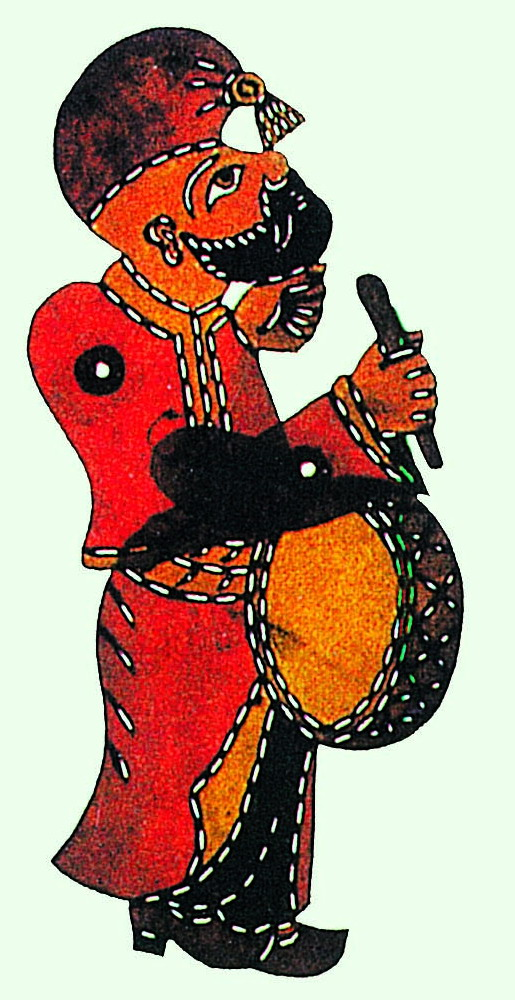
Karagöz, Turkish shadow puppetry

Middle Eastern puppetry, like its other theatre forms, is influenced by the Islamic culture. Karagoz, the Turkish Shadow Theatre, has widely influenced puppetry in the region and it is thought to have passed from China by way of India. Later, it was taken by the Mongols from the Chinese and passed to the Turkish peoples of Central Asia. The art of Shadow Theater was brought to Anatolia by the Turkish people emigrating from Central Asia. Other scholars claim that shadow theater came to Anatolia in the 16th century from Egypt. The advocates of this view claim that shadow theatre found its way into the Ottoman palaces when Yavuz Sultan Selim conquered Egypt in 1517. He saw shadow theatre performed during a party in his honour and he was said to be so impressed with it that he took the puppeteer back to his palace in Istanbul where his 21-year-old son, later Sultan Suleyman the Magnificent, developed an interest in the plays.

In other areas, the style of shadow puppetry known as khayal al-zill, a metaphor translated as "shadows of the imagination" or "shadow of fancy", still survives. This is a shadow play with live music, "the accompaniment of drums, tambourines and flutes...also..."special effects" – smoke, fire, thunder, rattles, squeaks, thumps, and whatever else might elicit a laugh or a shudder from his audience"

In Iran, puppets are known to have existed much earlier than 1000 AD, but initially only glove and string puppets were popular . Other genres of puppetry emerged during the Qajar era (18th and 19th centuries) as influences from Turkey spread to the region. Kheimeh Shab-Bazi is a traditional Persian puppet show which is performed in a small chamber by a musical performer and a storyteller called a morshed or naghal. These shows often take place alongside storytelling in traditional tea and coffee-houses (Ghahve-Khane). The dialogue takes place between the morshed and the puppets. A recent example of puppetry in Iran is the touring opera Rostam and Sohrab.

=== Europe ===
==== Ancient Greece and Rome ====
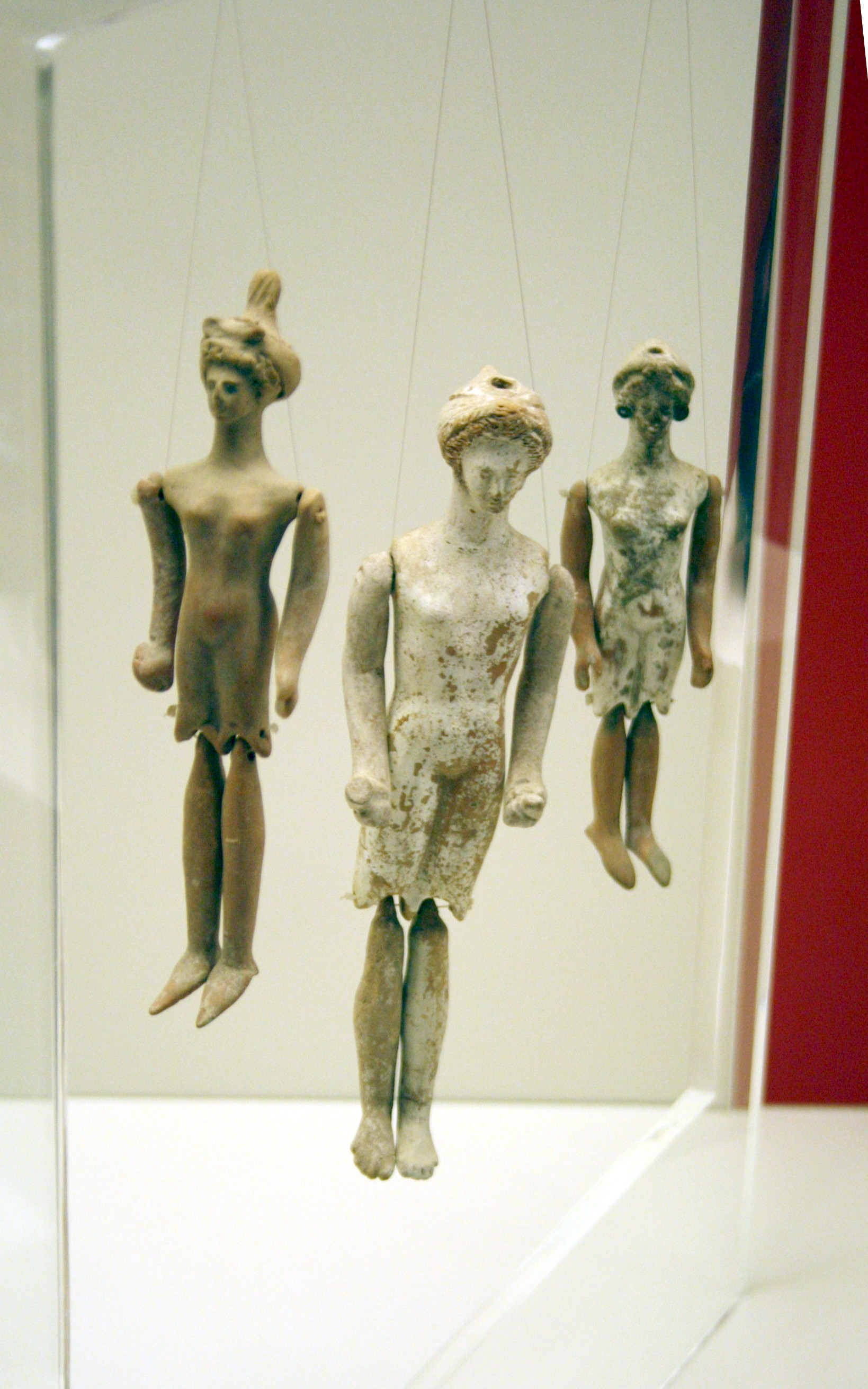
Ancient Greek terracotta puppet dolls, 5th/4th century BC, National Archaeological Museum, Athens

Although there are few remaining examples of puppets from ancient Greece, historical literature and archaeological findings shows the existence of puppetry. The Greek word translated as "puppet" is "νευρόσπαστος" (nevrospastos), which literally means "drawn by strings, string-pulling", from "νεῦρον" (nevron), meaning either "sinew, tendon, muscle, string", or "wire", and "σπάω" (spaō), meaning "draw, pull". Aristotle referred to pulling strings to control heads, hands and eyes, shoulders and legs. Plato's work also contains references to puppetry. The Iliad and the Odyssey were presented using puppetry. The roots of European puppetry probably extend back to the Greek plays with puppets played to the "common people" in the 5th century BC. By the 3rd century BC these plays would appear in the Theatre of Dionysus at the Acropolis.

In ancient Greece and ancient Rome clay dolls, and a few of ivory, dated from around 500 BC, were found in children's tombs. These dolls had articulated arms and legs, and in some cases an iron rod extending up from the tops of their heads. This rod was used to manipulate the doll from above, as it is done today in Sicilian puppetry. A few of these dolls had strings in place of rods. Some researchers believe these ancient figures were toys and not puppets, due to their small size.

==== Italy ====
===== Middle Ages and Renaissance =====
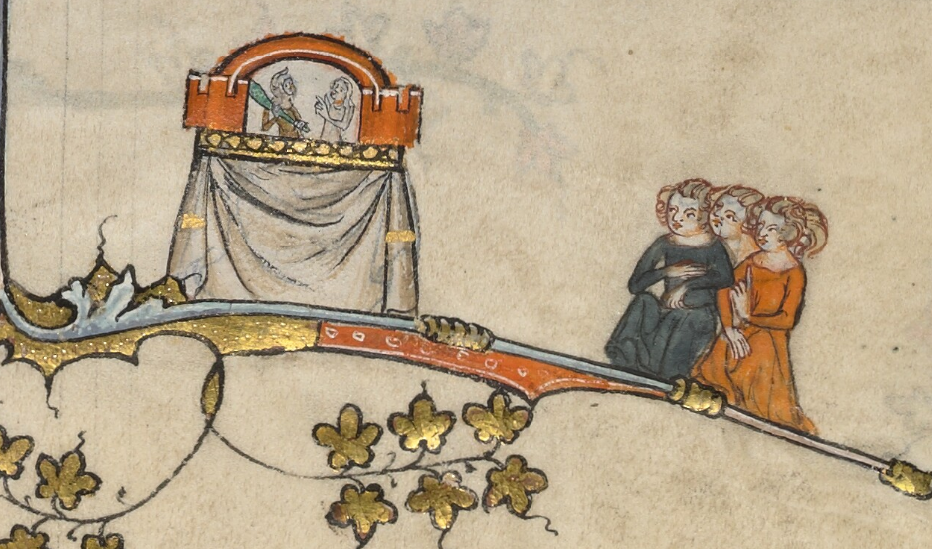
Illuminated border depicting a puppet show, 1338–1344

The Christian church used marionettes to perform morality plays. It is believed that the word marionette originates from the little figures of the Virgin Mary, hence the word "marionette" or "Mary doll. Comedy was introduced to the plays as time went by, and ultimately led to a church edict banning puppetry. Puppeteers responded by setting up stages outside cathedrals and became even more ribald and slapstick. Out of this grew the Italian comedy called Commedia dell'arte. Puppets were used at times in this form of theatre and sometimes Shakespeare's plays were performed using marionettes instead of actors. An early depiction of a puppet show within a castelet (shown right) illustrates fol. 54v of Li romans du boin roi Alixandre ('The Romance of the Good King Alexander'), a Flemish manuscript illuminated by the workshop of Jehan de Grise between 1338 and 1344.

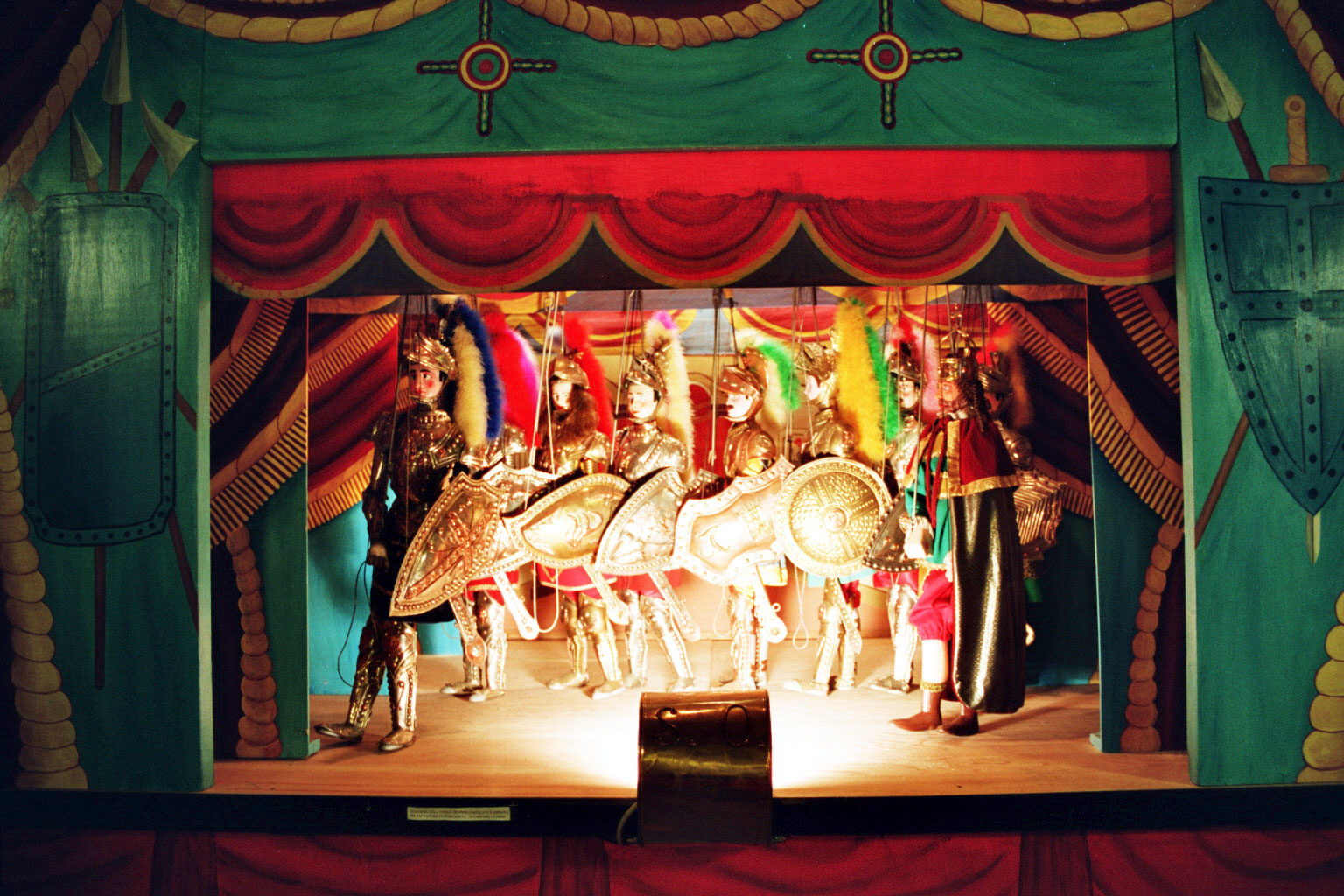
Sicilian puppet theatre

In Sicily, the sides of donkey carts are decorated with intricate, painted scenes from the Frankish romantic poems, such as The Song of Roland. These same tales are enacted in traditional puppet theatres featuring hand-made marionettes of wood. In Sicilian this is called "Opera dei pupi", or "Opera of the puppets". The "Opera dei pupi" and the Sicilian tradition of cantastorie, the word for storyteller, are rooted in the Provençal troubadour tradition, in Sicily during the reign of Frederick II, Holy Roman Emperor, in the first half of the 13th century.

===== 18th and 19th centuries =====
The 18th century was a period in the development of all Italian theatre, including the marionette theatre. The rod puppet was mainly of lower-class origin, but the marionette theatre was popular in aristocratic circles, as a celebration of the Age of Enlightenment. The effects, and the construction of the puppets, the puppet theatres, and the puppet narratives, were all popular, particularly in Venice. In the 19th century, the marionettes of Pietro Radillo became more complex and instead of just the rod and two strings, Radillo's marionettes were controlled by as many as eight strings, which increased control over the individual body parts of the marionettes.

==== France ====
Guignol is the main character in the French puppet show which has come to bear his name. Although often thought of as children's entertainment, Guignol's sharp wit and linguistic verve have always been appreciated by adults as well, as shown by the motto of a Lyon troupe: "Guignol amuses children… and witty adults". Laurent Mourguet, Guignol's creator, fell on hard times during the French Revolution, and in 1797 started to practice dentistry, which in those days was the pulling of teeth. To attract patients, he started setting up a puppet show in front of his dentist's chair.

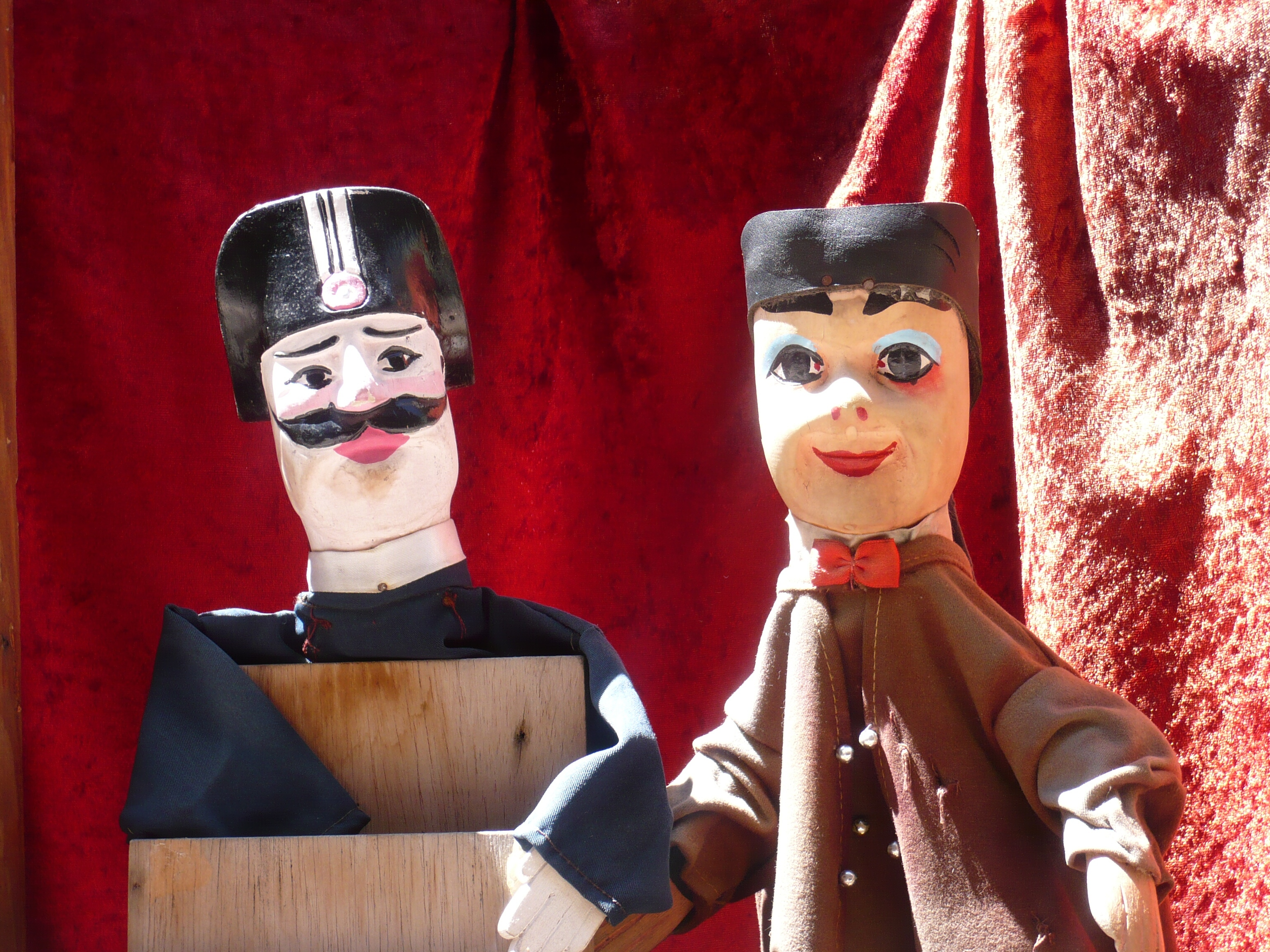
Guignol de Lyon

His first shows featured Polichinelle, a character borrowed from the Italian commedia dell'arte. By 1804 the success was such that he gave up dentistry altogether and became a professional puppeteer, creating his own scenarios drawing on the concerns of his working-class audience and improvising references to the news of the day. He developed characters closer to the daily lives of his Lyon audience, first Gnafron, a wine-loving cobbler, and in 1808 Guignol. Other characters, including Guignol's wife Madelon and the gendarme Flagéolet soon followed, but these are never more than foils for the two heroes. Guignol's victory is the triumph of good over evil.

==== Great Britain ====
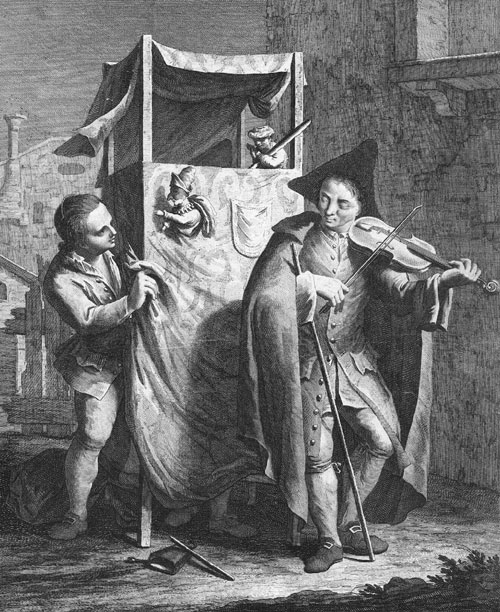
British puppet theatre (Punch and Judy style), c. 1770

The traditional British Punch and Judy puppetry traces its roots to the 16th century to the Italian commedia dell'arte. The character of "Punch" derives from the character Pulcinella, which was Anglicized to Punchinello. He is a manifestation of the Lord of Misrule and Trickster, figures of deep-rooted mythologies. Punch's wife was originally "Joan", but later became "Judy". In the late 18th and early 19th centuries, the familiar Punch and Judy puppet show which existed in Britain was performed in an easily transportable booth. The British Puppet and Model Theatre Guild in the early 20th century instigated a resurgence of puppetry. Two of the Guild's founders, H. W. Whanslaw and Waldo Lanchester, both worked to promote and develop puppetry with publications of books and literature, mainly focusing on the art of the marionette. Lanchester had a touring theatre and a permanent venue in Malvern, Worcestershire, regularly taking part in the Malvern Festival and attracting the attention of George Bernard Shaw. One of Shaw's last plays, Shakes versus Shav, was written for and first performed in 1949 by the company.

From 1957 to 1969, Gerry Anderson produced many television series starring marionettes, starting with Roberta Leigh's The Adventures of Twizzle and ending with The Secret Service. Many of these series employed a technique called supermarionation, which automatically synchronized the pre-recorded character dialogue to the puppets' mouth movements. Anderson returned to puppetry in 1983 with Terrahawks and the unaired pilot Space Police in 1987.

Current British puppetry theatres include the Little Angel Theatre in Islington, London, Puppet Theatre Barge in London, Norwich Puppet Theatre, the Harlequin Puppet Theatre, Rhos-on-Sea, Wales, and the Biggar Puppet Theatre, Biggar, Lanarkshire, Scotland. British puppetry now covers a wide range of styles and approaches. There are also a number of British theatre companies, including Horse and Bamboo Theatre, and Green Ginger, which integrate puppetry into highly visual productions. From 1984 to 1996, puppetry was used as a vehicle for political satire in the British television series Spitting Image. Puppetry has also been influencing mainstream theatre, and several recent productions combine puppetry with live action, including Warhorse, at the Royal National Theatre and Madam Butterfly at the English National Opera.

==== Netherlands, Denmark, Romania, and Russia ====
Many regional variants of Pulcinella were developed as the character spread across Europe. In the Netherlands it is Jan Klaassen (and Judy is Katrijn); in Denmark Mester Jackel; in Russia Petrushka; and in Romania Vasilache. In Russia, the Central Puppet Theatre in Moscow and its branches in every part of the country enhanced the reputation of the puppeteer and puppetry in general.

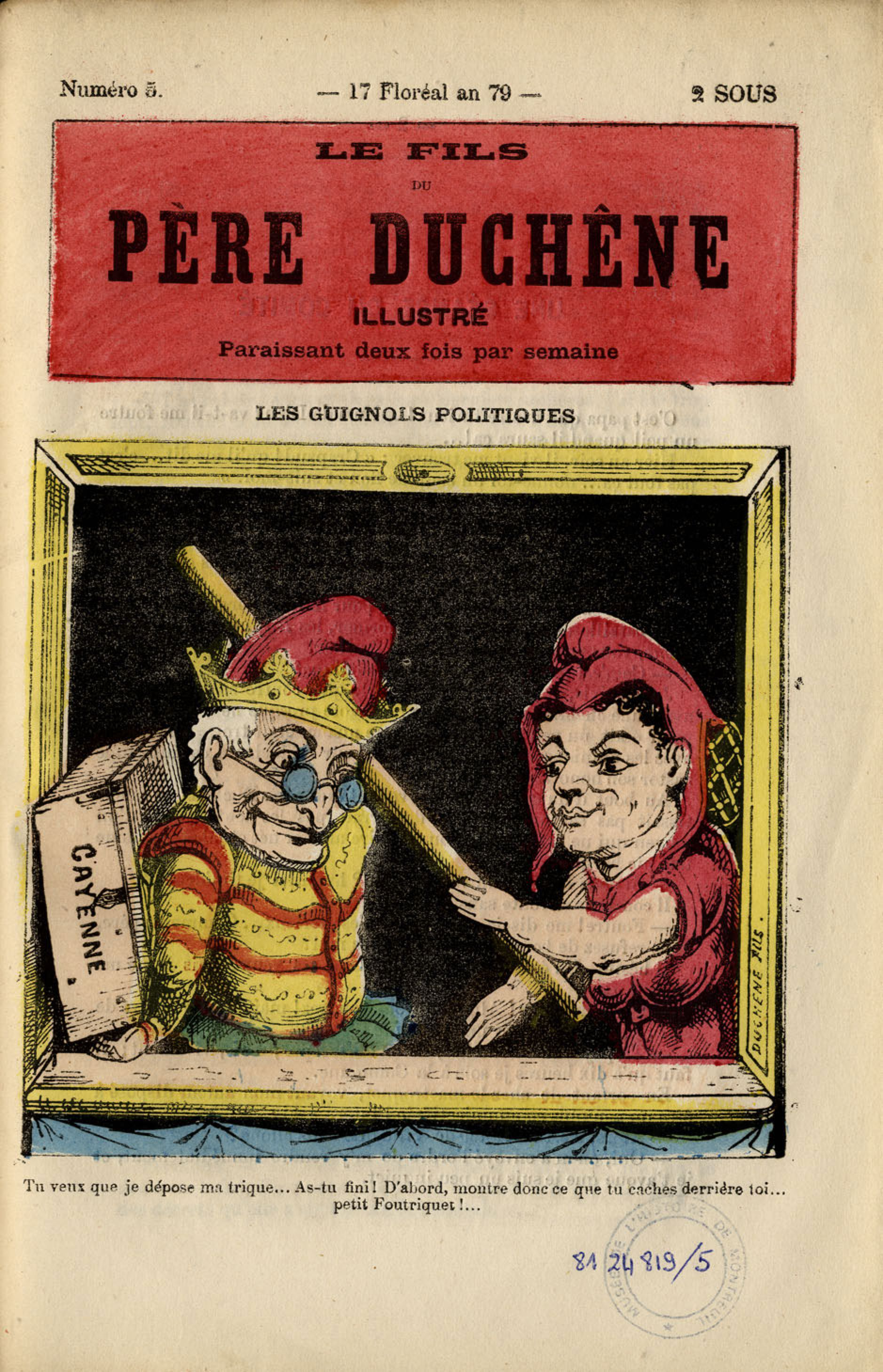
Polichinelle caricature, France

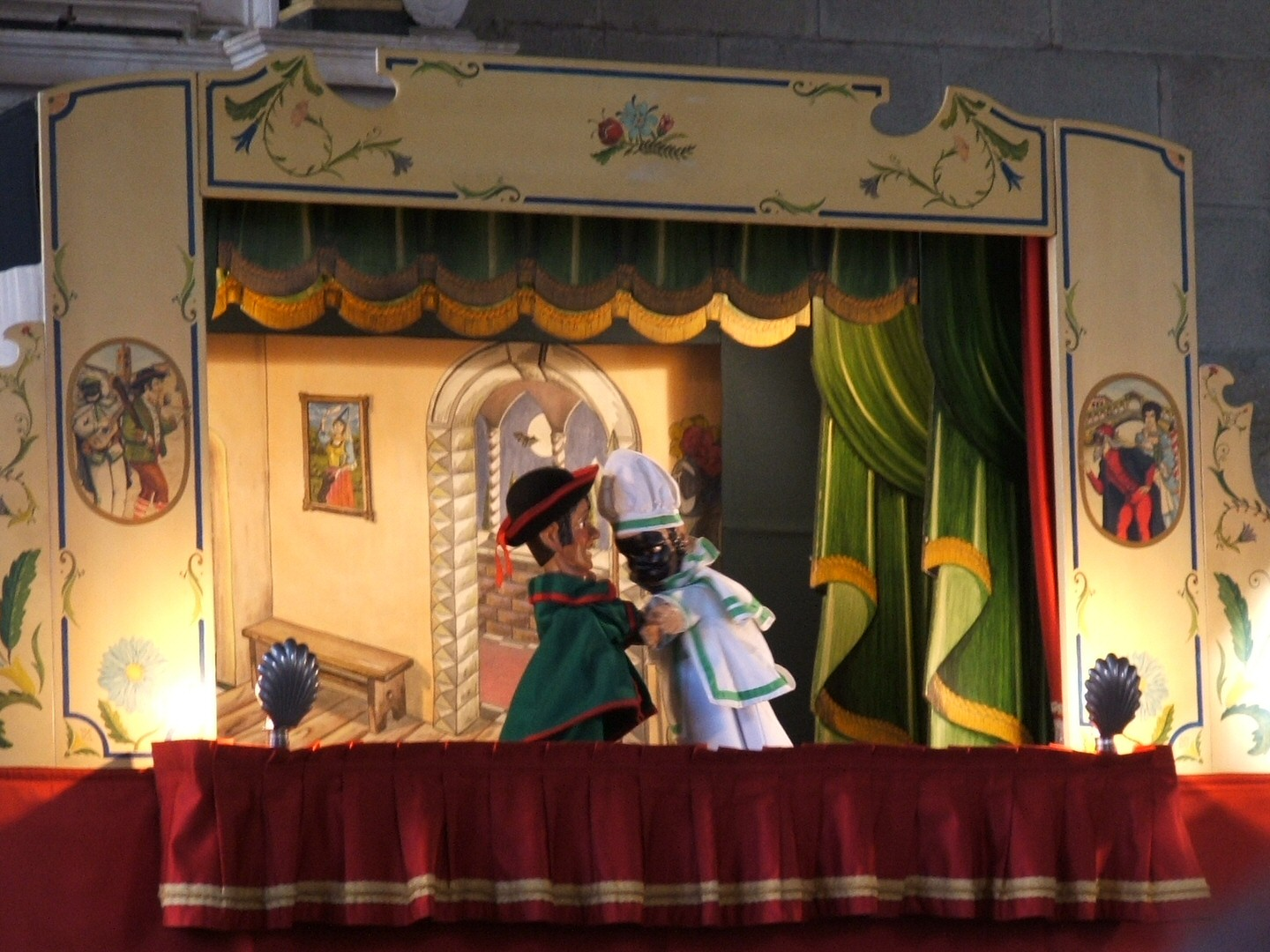
Puppet theater with Gioppino and Brighella, Bergamo Italy

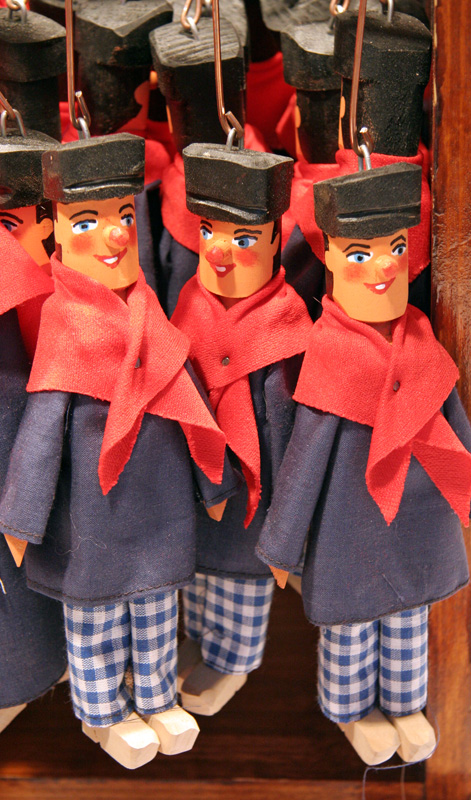
Traditional puppets from Liège, Belgium

==== Germany and Austria ====
There is a long tradition of puppetry in Germany and Austria. Much of it derives from the 16th-century tradition of the Italian commedia dell'arte. The German version of the British character of 'Punch' is called Kasperle of Kaspar while Judy is called Grete. In the 18th century, operas were specifically composed for marionette puppets. Gluck, Haydn, de Falla and Respighi all composed adult operas for marionettes.

In 1855, Count Franz Pocci founded the Munich Marionette Theatre. A German dramatist, poet, painter and composer, Pocci wrote 40 puppet plays for his theatre. Albrecht Roser has made a considerable impact with his marionettes in Stuttgart. His characters Clown Gustaf and Grandmother are well-known. Grandmother, while outwardly charming, is savagely humorous in her observations about all aspects of society and the absurdities of life.

In Lindau, the Lindau Marionette Opera was founded in 2000 by Bernard Leismueller and Ralf Hechelmann. The company performs a large number of operas as well as a marionette ballet, Swan Lake.

In Augsburg, the Augsburg Marionette Theatre was founded in 1943 by Walter Oehmichen. It continues to this day along with an adjoining puppet museum under the grandsons of the founder, Klaus Marschall and Juergen Marschall.

Much earlier in nearby Salzburg, Austria, the Salzburg Marionette Theatre was founded in 1913 by Professor Anton Aicher. The Salzburg Marionette Theatre still continues the tradition of presenting full-length opera using marionettes in their own purpose-built theatre until recently under the direction of Gretl Aicher. It performs mainly operas such as Die Fledermaus and The Magic Flute and a small number of ballets such as The Nutcracker.

There is also a marionette theatre at Schoenbrunn Palace in Vienna founded by Christine Hierzer-Riedler and Werner Hierzer over 40 years ago. The marionette theatre performs world famous operas, musicals and fairy tales.

==== Czech Republic and Slovakia ====
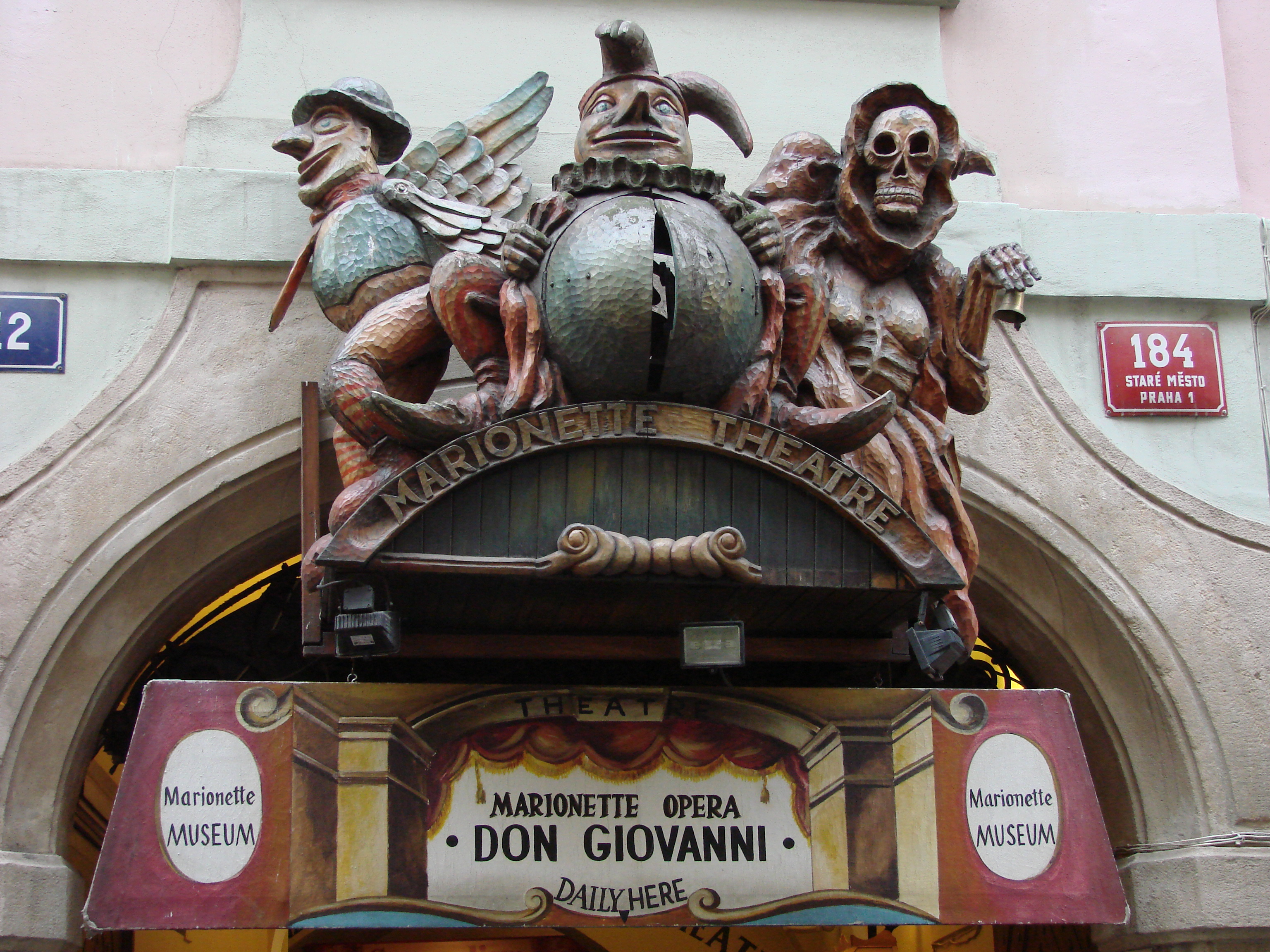
Marionette Theatre in Prague

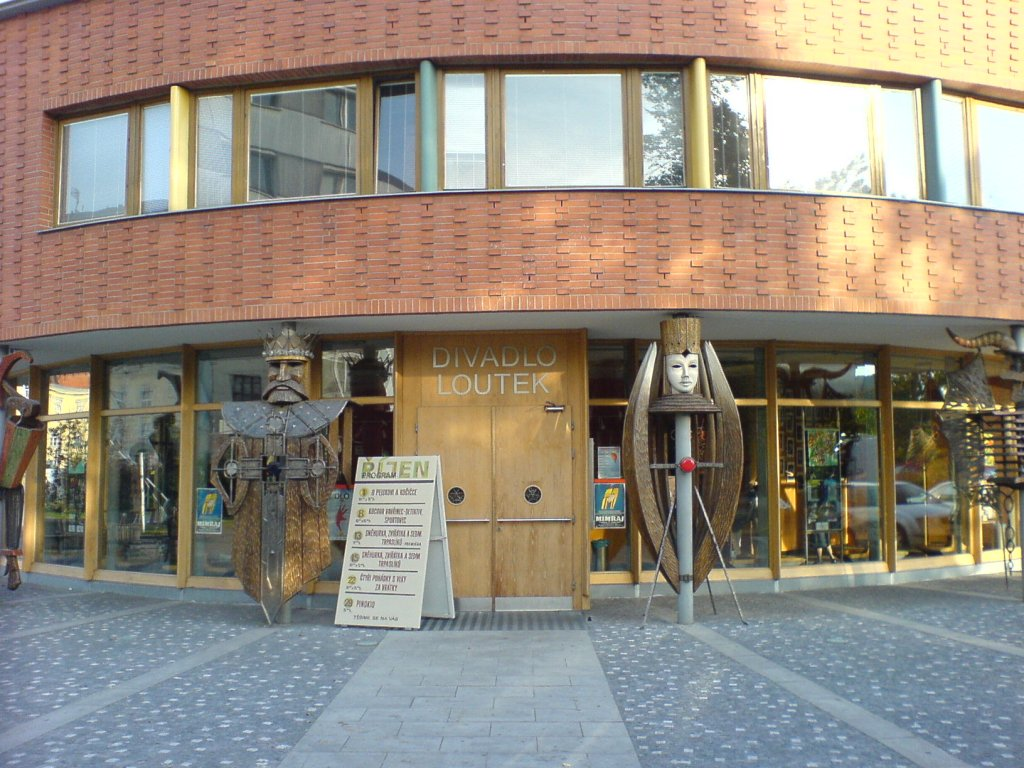
Puppet Theatre in Ostrava

Marionette puppet theatre has had a very long history in entertainment in Prague, and elsewhere in the former Czechoslovakia and then in the Czech Republic and Slovakia. It can be traced deep into the early part of the Middle Ages. Marionettes first appeared around the time of the Thirty Years' War. The first noted Czech puppeteer was Jan Jiří Brat, who was born in 1724. He was the son of a local carpenter and created his own puppet theatre. Matěj Kopecký was a 19th-century Czech puppeteer, and was responsible for communicating the ideas of national awareness.

In 1911, Jindřich Veselý co-founded the Czech Association of Friends of Puppet Theatre and in 1912 advocated the publication of the oldest specialist puppet-theatre magazine still published today, Loutkář. Veselý played a key role in founding UNIMA (International Puppetry Association) in 1929, and was elected its first president.

In 1920 and 1926 respectively, Josef Skupa created his puppet characters: Spejbl and Hurvínek, comical father and his rascal son. In 1930, he set up the first modern professional puppet theatre. An important puppet organisation is the National Marionette Theatre in Prague. Its repertoire mainly features a marionette production of Mozart's opera Don Giovanni. The production has period costumes and 18th-century setting. There are other companies, including Buchty a Loutky ("Cakes and Puppets"), founded by Marek Bečka. Puppets have been used extensively in animated films since 1946. Jiří Trnka was an acknowledged leader in this area. Miroslav Trejtnar is a puppeteer and teacher of traditional Czech marionette-making skills.

In 2016, Czech and Slovak Puppetry was included on the UNESCO Intangible Cultural Heritage Lists.

==== 19th century ====
Throughout this period, puppetry developed separately from the emerging mainstream of actor theatres, and the 'ragged' puppeteers performed outside of theatre buildings at fairs, markets etc., continuing to be classified along with bandits. In the 19th century, puppetry faced competition from other forms of theatre such as vaudeville and music hall.

=== North America ===
The Teotihuacan culture (Central Mexico) of 600 AD made figurines with moveable arms and legs as part of their funerary rites. Native Americans also used ceremonial puppets. In 1519, two puppeteers accompanied Hernando Cortez on his first journey to Mexico. Europeans brought their own puppet traditions with them, but gradually distinctive styles, forms and puppet characters developed in North America.

During the Depression, folk puppeteers traveled with carnivals, working with their own scripts and with dioramas and marionettes of their own manufacture.

Some advances in 20th-century puppetry have originated in the United States. Marionette puppetry was combined with television as early as the 1940s, with Howdy Doody of the United States being a notable marionette in this field. Bil Baird worked on revitalising marionette theatre and puppetry in the United States. He and his wife, Cora Eisenberg, had their own marionette theatre in New York. Ventriloquist, Edgar Bergen also made a major contribution. In the 1960s Peter Schumann's Bread and Puppet Theater developed the political and artistic possibilities of puppet theatre in a distinctive, powerful and immediately recognizable way. At roughly the same time, Jim Henson was creating a type of soft, foam-rubber and cloth puppet which became known collectively as Muppets. Initially, through the children's television show Sesame Street, and later in The Muppet Show and on film, these inspired many imitators and are today are recognised almost everywhere (Henson also branched out into animatronics through the formation of his Creature Shop, as showcased in his films The Dark Crystal and Labyrinth). Wayland Flowers also made a contribution to adult puppetry with his satirical puppet, Madame.

Sid and Marty Krofft are two of Americas puppeteers and were mainly known for their live action children's TV series in the 60s and 70s.

Puppets also have been used in the Star Wars films, notably with the character of Yoda. His voice and manipulation was provided by Frank Oz.

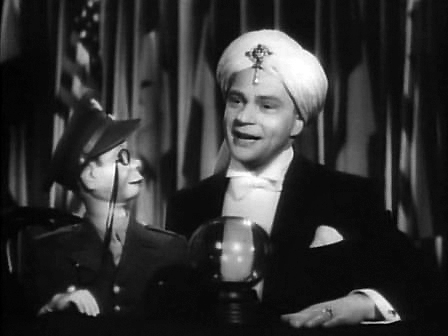
Edgar Bergen and his puppet Charlie McCarthy

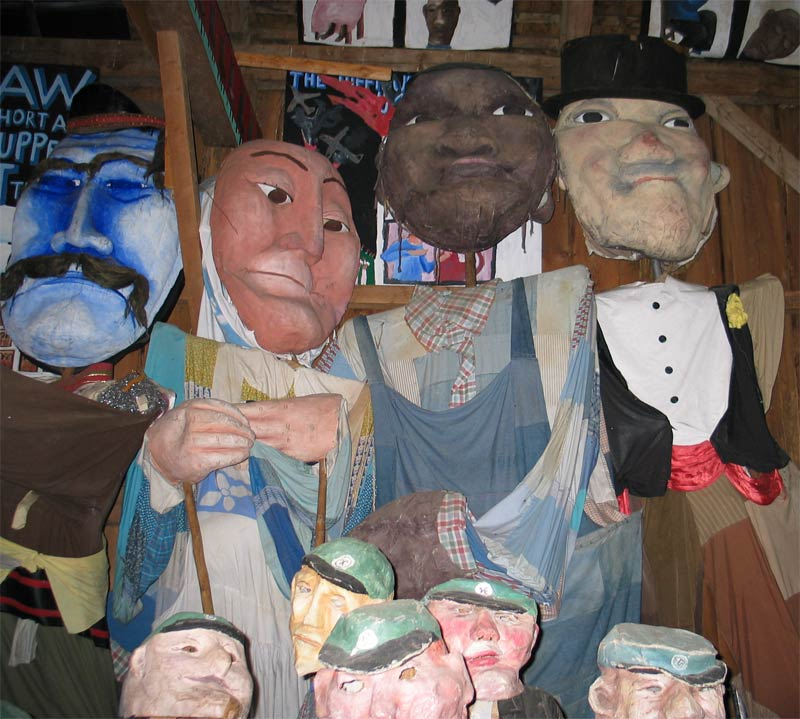
Puppets in the Bread and Puppet Theater Museum in Glover, Vermont, USA

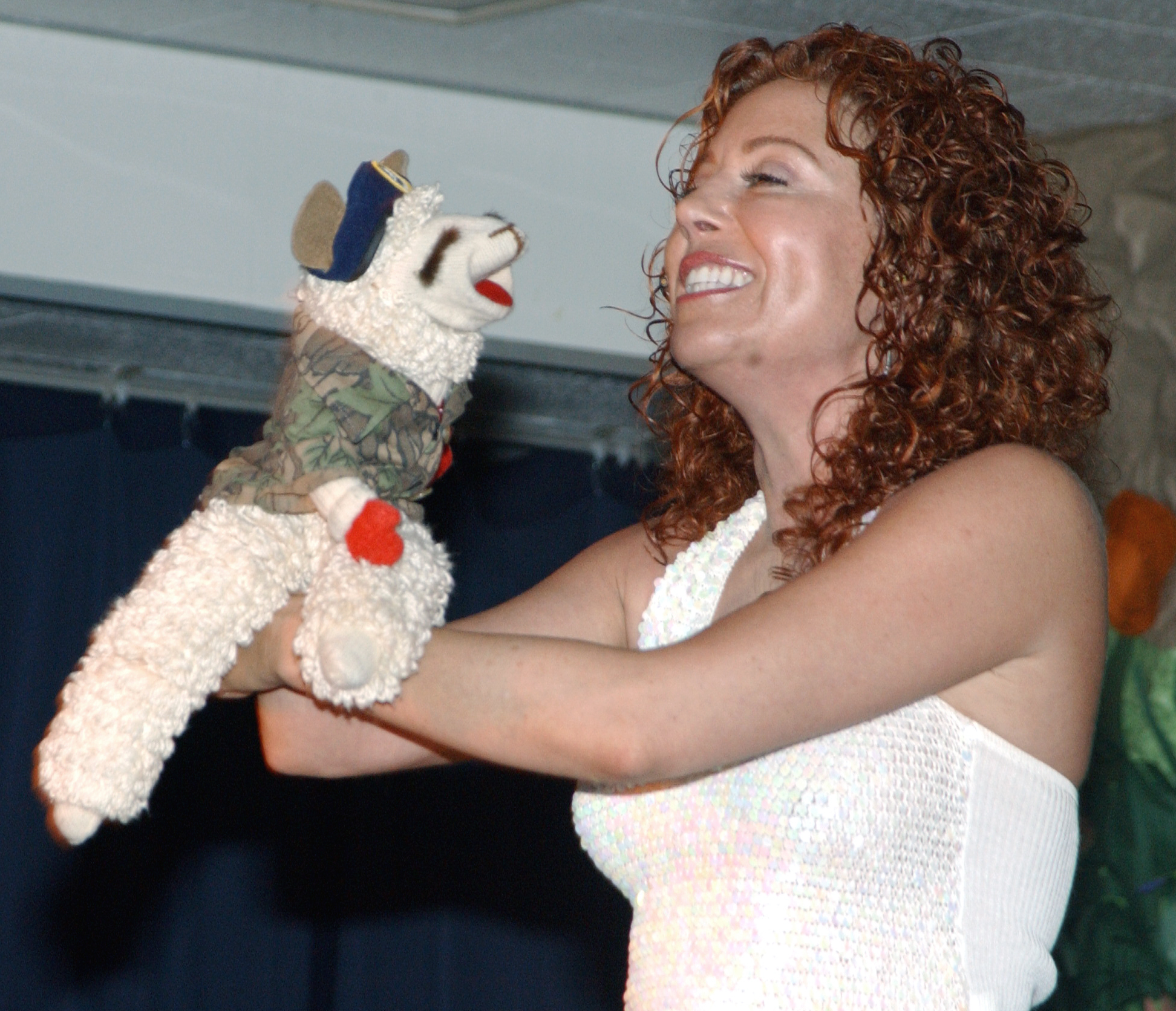
Mallory Lewis and Lamb Chop

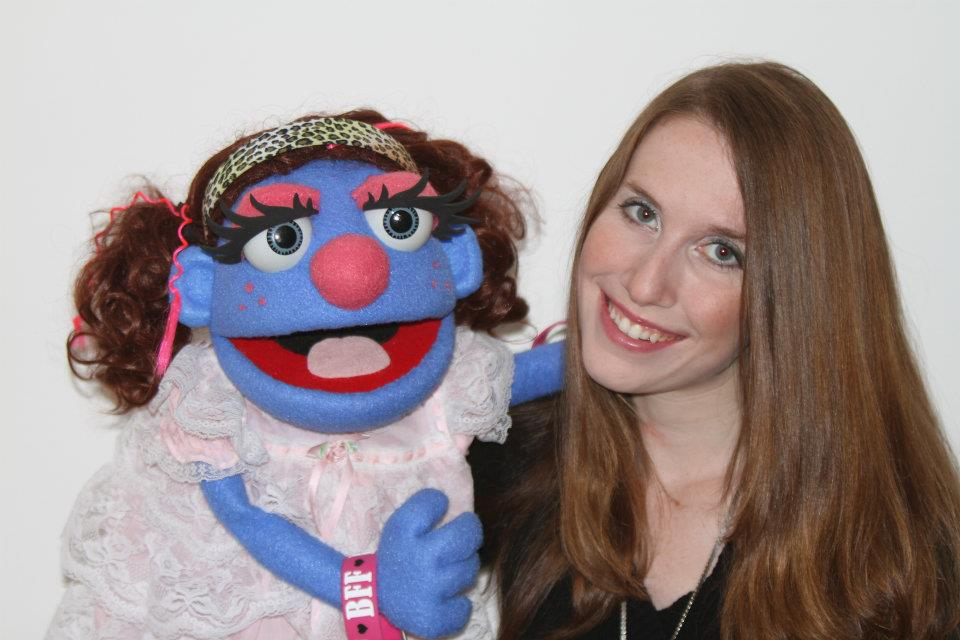
Leslie Madeline Fleming and Bleeckie, a character from a series of web videos.

=== Australia ===
The Aboriginal peoples of Australia have a long tradition of oral storytelling which goes back many thousands of years. They used masks and other objects to convey themes about morality and nature. Masks were carved from wood and heavily decorated with paint and feathers.

In Australia in the 1960s, Peter Scriven founded the Marionette Theatre of Australia and staged marionette productions such as The Tintookies, Little Fella Bindi, The Explorers and The Water Babies.

Phillip Edmiston, who worked alongside Peter Scriven at the Marionette Theatre of Australia, went on to mount in 1977 a lavish marionette production of The Grand Adventure under the umbrella of his own company, Theatrestrings. With 127 marionettes, the A$120,000 production opened in Nambour in the Civic Hall on 28 May 1977 and subsequently toured to Sydney, Melbourne and Brisbane. The musical was composed by Eric Gross with book and lyrics by Hal Saunders. The story broadly told of Captain James Cook's South Sea Island voyage with botanist Joseph Banks on HMS Endeavour. Edmiston went on to tour Queensland throughout the 1980s and 1990s with numerous productions with his new company Queensland Marionette Theatre.

Bilbar Puppet Theatre, established by Barbara Turnbull and her husband Bill Turnbull, toured Australia extensively under the auspices of the Queensland Arts Council in the 1970s and 1980s. Their shows included The Lucky Charm, Funnybone, Mozart's opera Bastien and Bastienne, and Lazy Liza. Bilbar Puppet Theatre's puppets are now held at the Queensland Performing Arts Centre, Brisbane. David Poulton toured marionette shows via the Queensland Arts Council along his 'Strings and Things' with his wife Sally for many years from the late 1970s. Gwen and Peter Iliffe also toured with Puppet People. One of their shows was Bees Hey using the music of Bizet. Another successful group were Ehmer Puppets.

David Hamilton tours independently and formerly toured under the auspices of the Queensland Arts Council. Some of his puppets were displayed in a special puppet exhibition mounted at the Queensland Performing Arts Complex in 2018.

Comedian and radio broadcaster Jamie Dunn was famous for his Muppet-style character, Agro, who featured on several Seven Network television programs throughout the 1980s and 1990s.

Formally trained in the United States by puppeteers from the Jim Henson Company, Brett Hansen and his Brisbane-based Larrikin Puppets company is one of only a few Muppet-style puppeteers actively performing in Australia. Cabaret Puppet Theatre, based in Brisbane's Redlands area, also tours with productions for children and adults.

In Melbourne, Handspan Theatre (1977–2002) evolved from humble collective beginnings to a large, design-rich theatre format dubbed 'Visual Theatre', and became a hothouse for innovative projects and multimedia collaborations within Australia and around the world. In 2021, Melbourne Puppet Kerfuffle was formed by Rob Irvin and teacher Chris Elkington with the vision of touring schools and kindergartens providing educational puppet shows based on curriculum topics. They have since expanded into providing entertainment for shopping centres and festivals across Victoria and interstate.

A post-graduate course existed at the Victorian College of the Arts, University of Melbourne in the late 1990s, but has since been discontinued.

Australian puppeteer Norman Hetherington was famous for his marionette, Mr. Squiggle, who featured on an Australian Broadcasting Commission television program from 1 July 1959 until 9 July 1999. In every episode he would create several pictures from "squiggles" sent in by children from around the country.

Richard Bradshaw OAM is another Australian puppeteer. He is a past president of UNIMA Australia, former artistic director of the Marionette Theatre Company of Australia, and does shadow puppetry and writing in the field.

Rod Hull also made a contribution with his puppet Emu. In the 1960s, Hull presented a children's breakfast television programme in Australia.

Snuff Puppets is one of Australia's modern puppet theatre troupes. Based in Melbourne, their work contains black humour, political and sexual satire.

There is an annual winter festival of puppets at the City of Melbourne's ArtPlay and at Federation Square in Melbourne.

In Sydney, Jeral Puppets, founded by John and Jackie Lewis in 1966, regularly performs at Puppeteria Puppet Theatre and on tour.

Spare Parts Puppet Theatre of Fremantle, Western Australia was founded by Peter Wilson, Cathryn Robinson, and Beverley Campbell-Jackson in 1981, as part of an artist-in-residency program initiated by the WA Institute of Technology (now Curtin University of Technology). The company's first project was a puppet adaptation of Christopher Marlowe's Doctor Faustus for the 1981 Festival of Perth.

== Contemporary era ==
From early in the 19th century, puppetry began to inspire artists from the 'high-art' traditions. In 1810, Heinrich von Kleist wrote an essay 'On the Marionette Theatre', admiring the "lack of self-consciousness" of the puppet. Puppetry developed throughout the 20th century in a variety of ways. Supported by the parallel development of cinema, television and other filmed media it now reaches a larger audience than ever. Another development, starting at the beginning of the century, was the belief that puppet theatre, despite its popular and folk roots, could speak to adult audiences with an adult, and experimental voice, and reinvigorate the high art tradition of actors' theatre.

Sergei Obraztsov explored the concept of kukolnost ('puppetness'). Others, including Edward Gordon Craig and Erwin Piscator were influenced by puppetry. Maeterlinck, Shaw, Lorca and others wrote puppet plays, and artists such as Picasso, Jarry, and Léger began to work in theatre. Craig's concept of the "übermarionette" —— in which the director treats the actors like objects —— has been highly influential on contemporary "object theatre" and "physical theatre". Tadeusz Kantor frequently substituted actors for puppets, or combined the two, and conducted each performance from the edge of the stage, in some ways similar to a puppeteer.

Kantor influenced a new formalist generation of directors such as Richard Foreman and Robert Wilson who were concerned with the 'object' in theatrical terms "putting it on stage and finding different ways of looking at it" (Foreman). Puppeteers such as Tony Sarg, Waldo Lanchester, John Wright, Bil Baird, Joan Baixas, Sergei Obratsov, Philipe Genty, Peter Schumann, Dattatreya Aralikatte, The Little Players, Jim Henson, Dadi Pudumjee, and Julie Taymor have also continued to develop the forms and content of puppetry, so that the phrase 'puppet theatre' is no longer limited to traditional forms of marionettes, glove, or rod puppets. Directors and companies like Peter Schumann of Bread and Puppet Theatre, Bob Frith of Horse and Bamboo Theatre, and Sandy Speiler of In the Heart of the Beast Puppet and Mask Theatre have also combined mask and puppet theatre where the performer, puppets and objects are integrated within a largely visual theatre world that minimises the use of spoken language.

The Jim Henson Foundation, founded by puppeteer and Muppet creator Jim Henson, is a philanthropic, charitable organization created to promote and develop puppetry in the United States. It has bestowed 440 grants to innovative puppet theatre artists. Puppetry troupes in the early 21st-century such as HomeGrown Theatre in Boise, Idaho continue the avant garde satirical tradition for millennials.

Snuff Puppets Skullies from Scarey

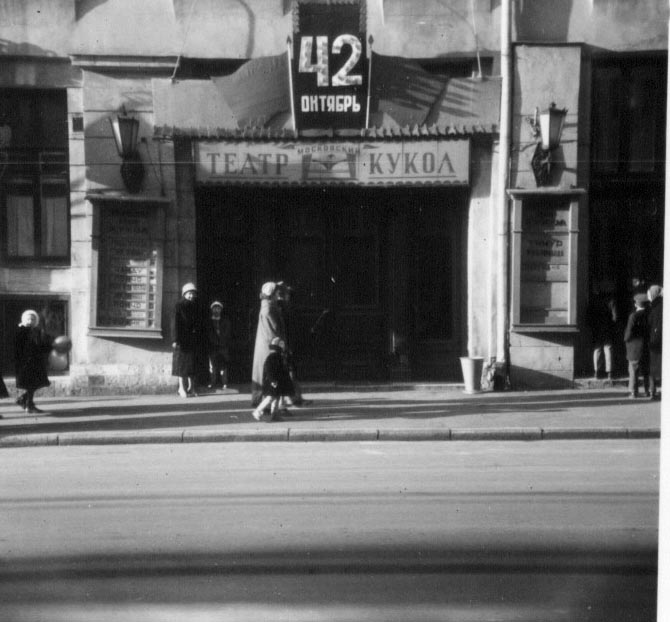
Puppet theatre in Moscow, Russia in 1958

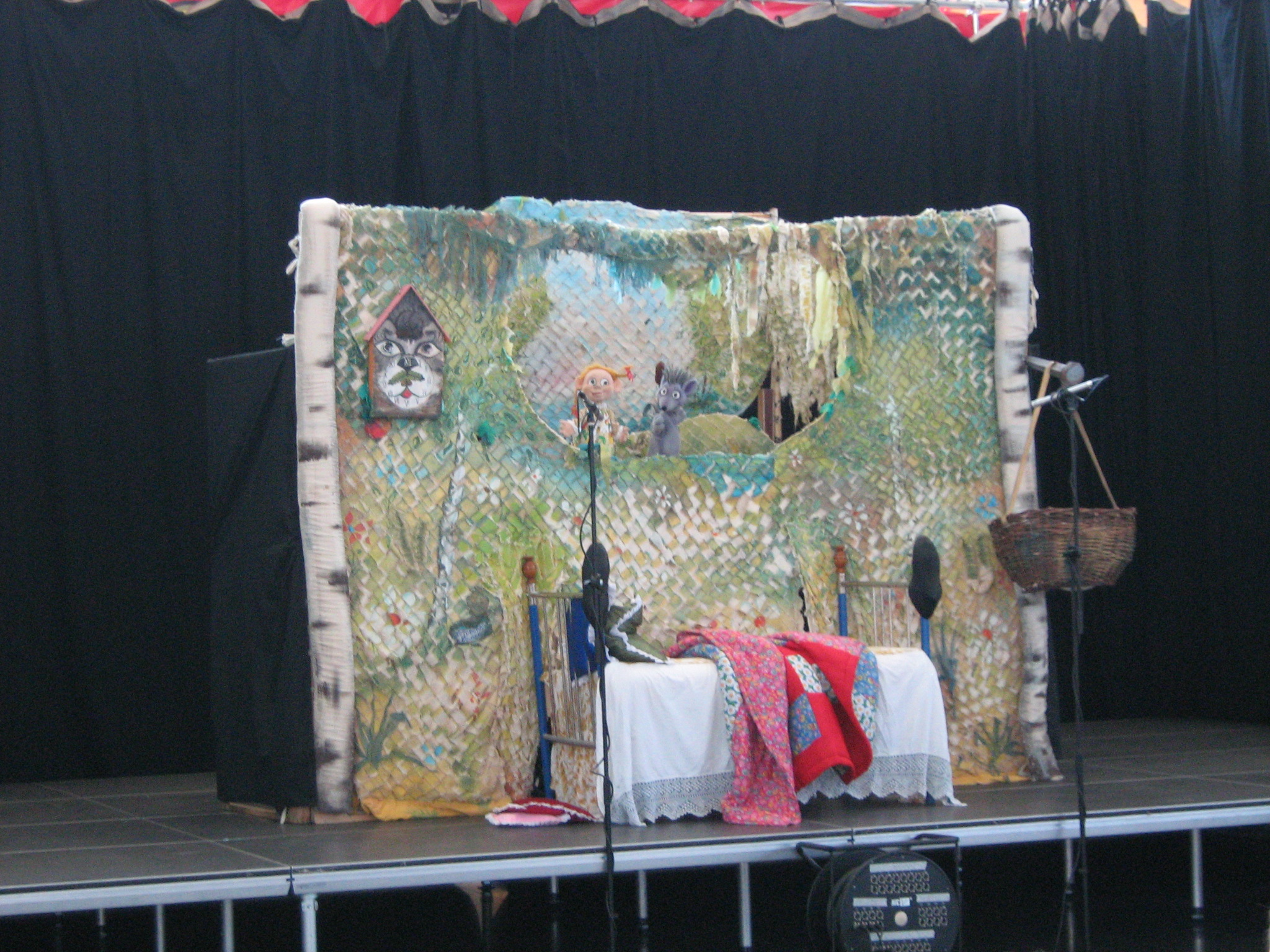
Performance of the Kstovo Puppet Theatre

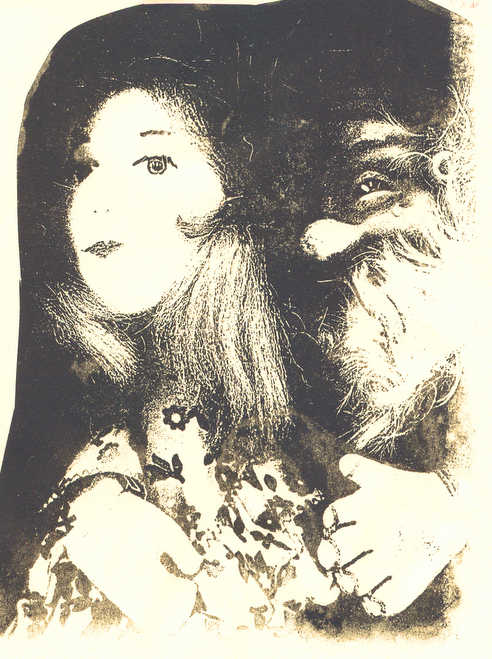
Two 20th-century hand puppets

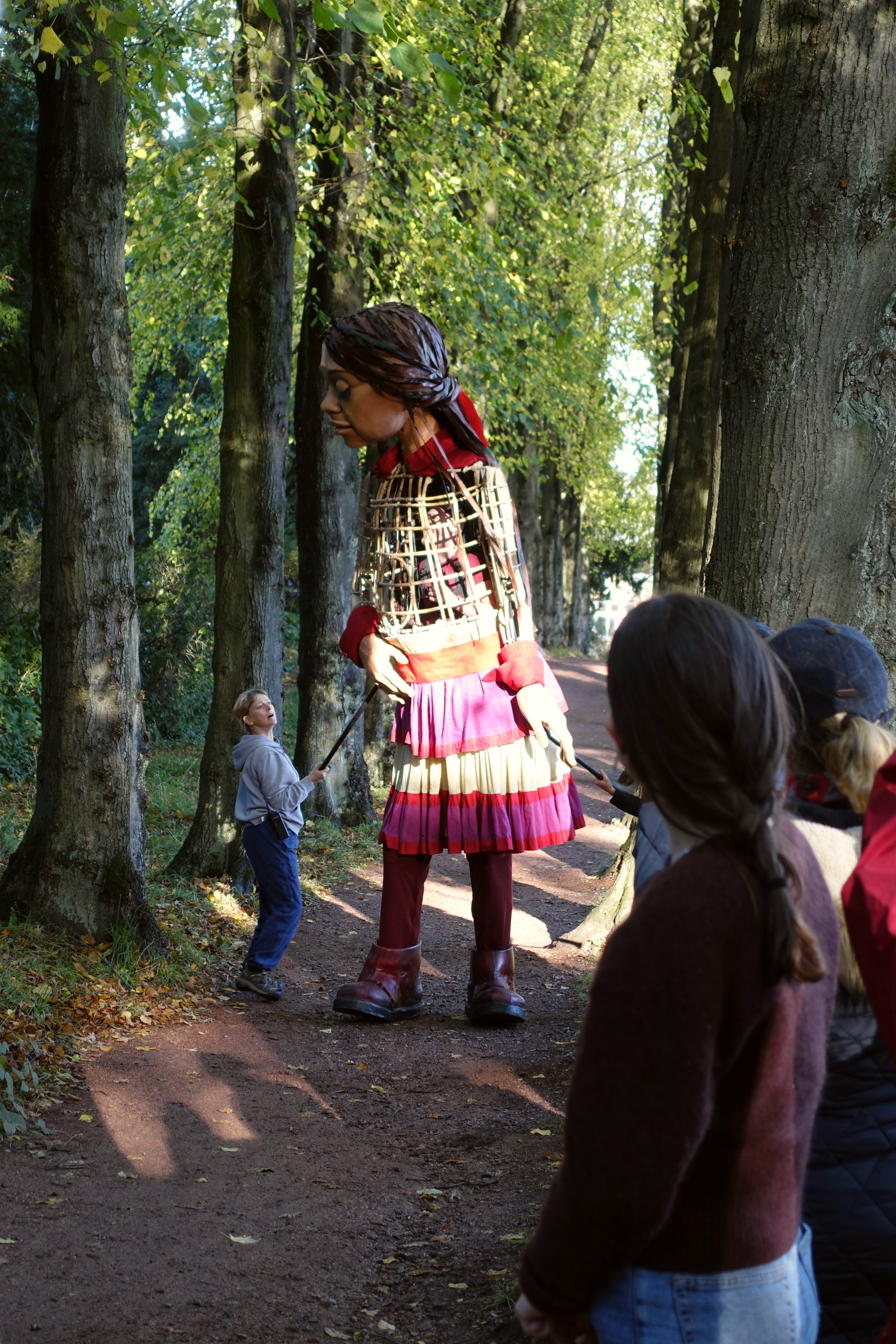
The animatronic puppet Little Amal, 2021

== Events ==
The International Puppet Festival (PIF) has taken place annually mid-September in Zagreb, Croatia since 1968.

The Puppet Festival Mississauga has taken place annually in March in Mississauga, Ontario, Canada since 2020.

== Types ==
=== Method ===
- Digital puppetry
- Hand puppet
- Shadow puppetry
- Water puppetry

=== By Culture ===
- Vertep
- Russian puppet theater
- Glove puppetry

== See also ==
- The Little Marionette Company
- List of highest grossing puppet films
- Pardeh show
- State Puppet Theatre of Fairy Tales
- UNIMA – International Puppetry Association
- World Puppetry Day
- Lisa Sturz; Red Herring Puppets

== Books and articles ==
- Baird, Bil (1966). The Art of the Puppet. Plays. ISBN 0-8238-0067-9.
- Beaton, Mabel; Les Beaton (1948). Marionettes: A Hobby for Everyone. New York.
- Bell, John (2000). Shadows: A Modern Puppet History. Detroit, USA: Detroit Institute of Art. ISBN 0-89558-156-6.
- Binyon, Helen (1966). Puppetry Today. London: Studio Vista Limited.
- Choe, Sang-su (1961). A Study of the Korean Puppet Play. The Korean Books Publishing Company Ltd.
- Currell, David (1992). An Introduction to Puppets and Puppetmaking. London: New Burlington Books, Quintet Publishing Limited. ISBN 1-85348-389-3.
- Dubska, Alice; Jan Novak; Nina Malikova; Marie Zdenkova (2006). Czech Puppet Theatre. Prague: Theatre Institute. ISBN 80-7008-199-6.
- Dugan, E.A. (1990). Emotions in Motion. Montreal, Canada: Galerie Amrad. ISBN 0-9693081-5-9.
- Feeney, John (1999). Puppet. Saudi Aramco World.
- Funni, Arthur (2000). The Radio Years of Bergen and McCarthy (Thesis). The Margaret Herrick Library.
- Hayali, Mustafa Mutlu. Tradition Folk The Site. Ankara, Turkey: Theatre Department, Ankara University Faculty of Language, History and Geography.
- Latshaw, George (2000). The Complete Book of Puppetry. London: Dover Publications. ISBN 978-0-486-40952-8.
- Lindsay, Hilarie (1976). The First Puppet Book. Leichhardt, NSW, Australia: Ansay Pty Ltd. ISBN 0909245061.
- Logan, David (2007). Puppetry. Brisbane, QLD, Australia: Brisbane Dramatic Arts Co. ISBN 978-0-9804563-0-1.
- Plassard, Didier (2026). Puppetry and Dramaturgy. Western European Plays for Puppet Theatre, 1582–2020. Palgrave Studies in Theatre and Performance History. London: Palgrave Macmillan Cham & Springer Nature. doi:10.1007/978-3-032-05151-6. ISBN 978-3-032-05151-6.
- Robinson, Stuart; Patricia Robertson (1967). Exploring Puppetry. London: Mills & Boon Limited.
- Sinclair, Anita (1995). The Puppetry Handbook. Richmond, Victoria, Australia: Richard Lee Publishing. ISBN 0-646-39063-5.
- Suib, Leonard; Muriel Broadman (1975). Marionettes Onstage!. New York: Harper & Row, Publishers. ISBN 0-06-014166-2.
- Vella, Maeve; Helen Rickards (1989). Theatre of the Impossible: puppet theatre in Australia. Roseville, N.S.W: Craftsman's House. ISBN 0-947131-21-3.
- "Wayland Flowers Dies: Ventriloquist Was 48". The New York Times. October 12, 1988.
