= Green Ginger =

Green Ginger is a European theatre company based in Bristol, UK and Wiseppe, France that creates adult-oriented theatre and films featuring puppetry. Founded by Terry Lee in 1978, the company regularly tours its theatre productions throughout the world. Green Ginger collaborates with major arts organisations, including Welsh National Opera and Aardman Animations and its members teach at University of Bristol, Bath Spa University and the Royal Welsh College of Music & Drama.

Green Ginger has two artistic directors: Terry Lee who oversees the production of short puppet films in the company's French base; whilst Chris Pirie is responsible for its production base in Bristol, UK. Film Director Terry Gilliam became patron of Green Ginger in 2001.

Productions A Television Show (1978), Mack the Giant Thriller (1980), The Last Resort (1981), The Story So Far; The Beginning (1984), The Story So Far; Before the Beginning (1986), Gaston le Gouache (1987), Madame Zero (1989), Frank Einstein; Born to be Wired (1993), Boris the Eurobot (1994), PRATs (1996), Slaphead; Demon Barber (1996), Gaston and Pedro (1998), Bambi - The Wilderness Years (2000), Frank Einstein – Rewired (2001), Rust (2005), Mac et le Geant (2007), Zelda (2009), Le Drame des Autres (2012), Lionel the Vinyl (2013), Outpost (2014), Petit'Tom (2016), Intronauts (2018), RATLab (2022).

Intronauts (2018) was its 21st original production and marked the company's 40th anniversary. The touring show, directed by Emma Williams and with an original soundscore by composer Simon Preston, was inspired by cult 60s sci-fi movies and portrayed a dystopian future where those with disposable income could buy have miniaturised human cleaners injected into their bodies to carry out routine maintenance and healthcare.

Collaborations In 2000, Green Ginger and Amy Rose Projects created puppetry solutions for Welsh National Opera's new production of Tchaikovsky's Queen of Spades. The opera was subsequently performed in numerous European and North American cities between 2002 and 2023, with Green Ginger directing and performing the puppetry on each occasion. In 2016, Green Ginger provided design and movement consultancy during the creation of 4 metre-long mini-spiders for Arcadia Spectacular's Metamorphosis show. In 2023, Green Ginger's Chris Pirie performed Sparkman; an alien puppet musician from The Weirdos, during Coldplay's Music of the Spheres World Tour.
