= The Little Marionette Company =

South African puppet company

The Little Marionette company is a South African puppet company. The company was established in 1975 by Hansie Visagie and Reinette Kruyswijk, since then Althea Labuschangne, Ann Bailes, Con Visagie, Frauke Kröger and Thys Stander became involved with the company for many years.

Hansie Visagie served as artistic director of the company. Over its history, the company has designed and produced numerous puppet theatre productions in various genres. Performances have been staged at a variety of venues in South Africa, including the State Theatre (Pretoria), as well as abroad in France, Austria, the United States of America and Denmark.

The company has been involved in conceptualizing, designing, manufacturing, manipulating, directing and producing puppets for television in South Africa since 1980, especially for children’s programmes screened over the years on SABC TV, previously TV 1, 2 and 3, CCV, BOP TV, M-Net, e TV and Kyk-Net.

Various freelance artists are included in productions according to the needs of the projects the company designs and makes.

In 2003, puppets designed by the company were featured in an exhibition at the Absa Gallery in Johannesburg to celebrate puppets as an art form.
