= Carrillo (puppetry) =

Traditional puppetry in the Philippines

Carrillo is a form of shadow puppetry in the Philippines during the time of Spanish colonization.

== Etymology ==
The term carrillo refers to the small traveling carts used to transport the puppets. Onwards, the term was used to refer to the whole shadow puppetry performance.

== History ==
Carrillo is a shadow puppetry that uses puppets made of cardboard. The first recorded carrillo was in 1879 in Quiapo, Manila. The performance often presented moro-moro, a tale where Christian heroes usually defeat Muslim opponents.

Jose Rizal, the national hero of the country, had staged a carillo. He used a carton and a stick for the puppet. Then, he placed this at the back of a white cloth and used a candle light at its back.

Today, carrillo is no longer performed. In 2019, an exhibit was organized for carrillo at the Cultural Center of the Philippines Complex.
