= Pietro Radillo =

Venetian puppeteer

Pietro Radillo (1820–1895), the Venetian puppeteer, made significant innovations in the marionette arts. Expanding upon the traditional rod and two strings for control of marionettes, Radillo's puppets worked with up to eight strings, significantly improving the control over the individual body parts.
