= Puppeteer =

Person who manipulates a puppet

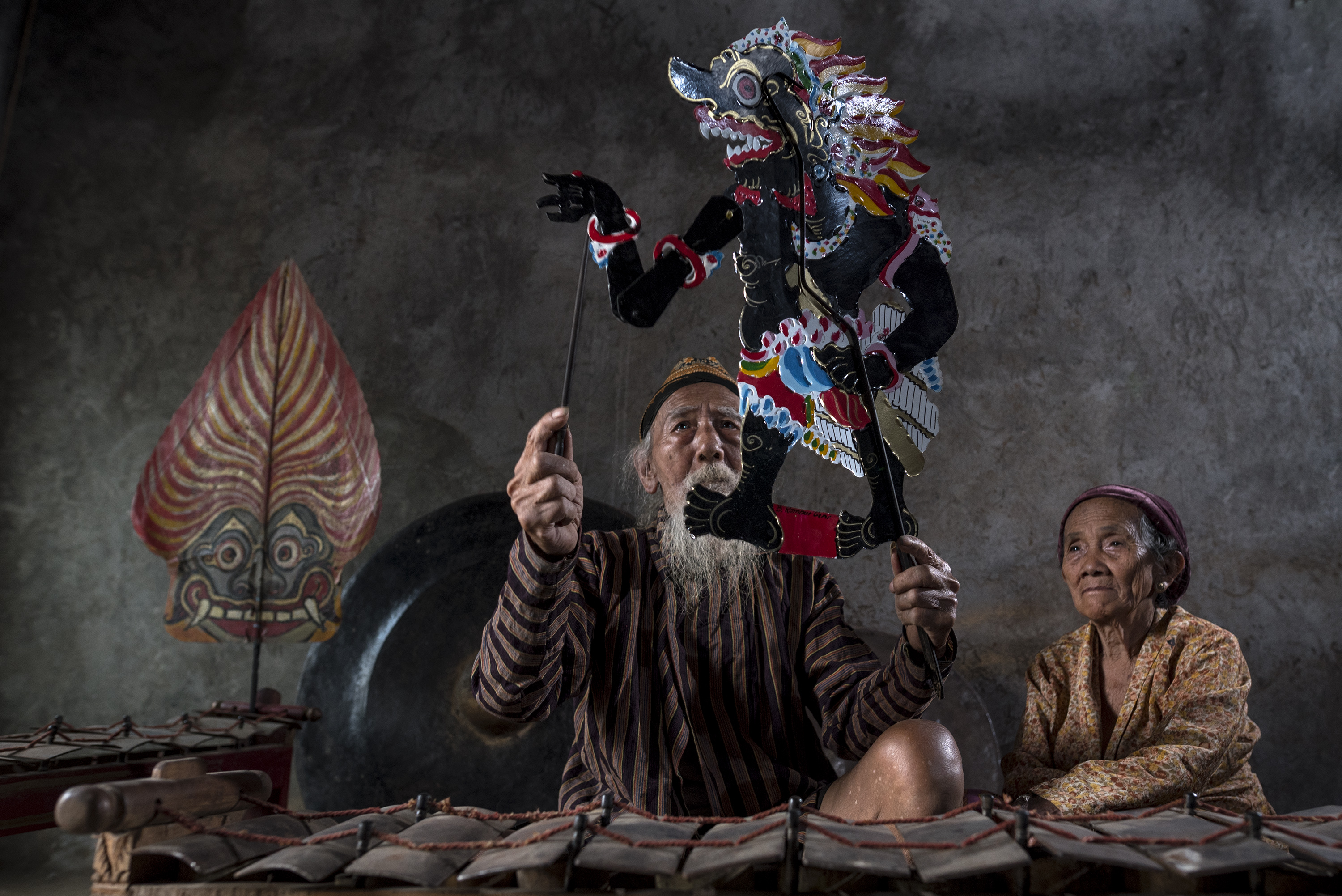
Wayang Kulit, also known as Wajang Koelit, is a form of puppet theatre art originated from Indonesian island of Java.

A puppeteer is a person who manipulates an inanimate object called a puppet to create the illusion that the puppet is alive. The puppet is often shaped like a human, animal, or legendary creature. The puppeteer may be visible to or hidden from the audience.

== Description ==
Performing as a puppeteer can be physically demanding. A puppeteer can operate a puppet indirectly by the use of strings, rods, wires, electronics or directly by their own hands placed inside the puppet or holding it externally or any other part of the body- such as the legs. Some puppet styles require two or more puppeteers to work together to create a single puppet character.

The puppeteer's role is to manipulate the physical object in such a manner that the audience believes the object is imbued with life. In some instances, the persona of the puppeteer is also an important feature, as with ventriloquist's dummy performers, in which the puppeteer and the human figure-styled puppet appear onstage together, and in theatre shows like Avenue Q.

The puppeteer might speak in the role of the puppet's character, synchronising the movements of the puppet's mouth. However, there is much puppetry which does not use the moving mouth (which is a lip-sync innovation created originally for television where close-ups are popular). Often, in theatre, a moveable mouth is used only for gestural expression, or speech might be produced by a non-moving mouth. In traditional glove puppetry often one puppeteer will operate two puppets at a time out of a cast of several. Much work is produced without any speech at all with all the emphasis on movement.

In a shadow play, only the shadows of the puppets are seen on a screen positioned between the puppets and the audience.

The relationship between the puppeteer and the puppet-maker is similar to that between an actor and a playwright, in cases where a puppet-maker designs a puppet for a puppeteer. Very often, though, the puppeteer assumes the joint roles of puppet-maker, director, designer, writer and performer. In this case a puppeteer is a more complete theatre practitioner than is the case with other theatre forms, in which one person writes a play, another person directs it, and then actors performs the lines and gestures.

Puppetry is a complex medium sometimes consisting of live performance, sometimes contributing to stop frame puppet animation, and film where performances might be technically processed as motion capture, CGI or as virtual puppetry.

=== Japanese puppeteers ===
In the 7th century, groups of puppeteers from Asia immigrated to Japan. They were called kugutsushi (傀儡子). They traveled around the country performing with glove puppets asking, for alms. In the 13th century, they settled down around shrines and temples, in particular, in Nishinomiya in Hyogo prefecture and Awaji Island in the Seto Inland. One of the most famous troupes of kugutsushi was ebisukaki (えびすかき), led by Hyakudayu, settled near Ebisu Shrine in Nishinomiya.

The joruri style narration dates back to the 10th century with monks called Biwa hōshi, who told the stories of the temples and other Buddhist stories, accompanied with music played with a biwa. In the 12th century, monks started to chant various war tales from The Tale of the Heike. This style of storytelling was called heikyoku (平曲), but it soon became old-fashioned. In the early 16th century, they began to tell more romantic and happy stories, the most popular being The tales of Princess Joruri (浄瑠璃姫物語, Jōrurihime monogatari). The new style of chanting adopted for the story became so popular that any storytelling of this kind started to be called 'joruri'. In the late 16th century, a three-stringed musical instrument, taken to Japan mainland from China via Okinawa, was improved and converted into a four-stringed Japanese lute, the shamisen. Compared with the grave and low tone of biwa, the shamisen was brighter in sound, making joruri more lively and appealing to the audience. By the early 17th century, the combination of the art of joruri narration, shamisen music and the puppetry of kugutsushi gave birth to what Ningyo Joruri is today. In Bunraku ningyo joruri stage performances, actors and musicians perform with puppets as part of the work. Japanese Bunraku puppeteers spend many years of their life preparing to perform. For a main puppeteer, it takes at least 22 years: 2 years of Bunraku school, 10 years learning how to move the legs, and another 10 to learn the movement of the puppet's left arm. The puppeteer is now ready to learn how to control the movement of the head and right arm. To control each puppet, 3 puppeteers, who are visible to the public, are needed. The omozukai, the main puppeteer, dresses sometimes in very colorful clothing. They control the right hand of the puppet with their right hand. Two other puppeteers, dressed in black ninja-like tunic (kurogo), one, the hidari-zukai, controls the puppet's left hand with their left hand using a control bar that extends from the puppet's elbow, while the other puppeteer, the ashi-zukai, controls the legs and feet. All three have to work in perfect synchronicity.

In some cases of Nihon-buyō, the puppeteer stands behind actors who act like puppets (ningyō-buri). In some performances, possession and manipulation spells are used to control actors referred to as "dolls". These dolls are sometimes inanimate objects brought to life by magic.

== Notable people ==
- Bil Baird (1904-1987), American puppeteer
- Edgar Bergen (1903-1978), American ventriloquist, comedian, actor, vaudevillian and radio performer
- Jeff Dunham (born 1962), American ventriloquist, stand-up comedian and actor
- Ali Etesamifar (born 1990), Iranian puppeteer
- Mollie Falkenstein (1906–1992), American dancer and puppeteer
- Jim Henson (1936–1990), American puppeteer, filmmaker and actor; best-known as the creator of The Muppets
- Shari Lewis (1933-1998), American ventriloquist puppeteer, children's entertainer, television show host, dancer, comedian, singer, actress and author
- Marica Mikulová (1951–2024), Slovak puppeteer
- Frank Oz (born 1944), American puppeteer, filmmaker and actor
- Larry Reed (1944–2026), American shadow puppeteer
- Fred Rogers (1928-2003), American television personality, Presbyterian minister, and author; best-known as the creator and host of Mister Rogers' Neighborhood
- Josef Skupa (1892–1957), Czech puppeteer
- Burr Tillstrom (1917-1985), American puppeteer; best-known as the creator and star of Kukla, Fran, and Ollie
- Jusaburō Tsujimura (1933–2023), Japanese puppeteer
- Señor Wences (1896-1999), Spanish ventriloquist and comedian

== See also ==
- Adult puppeteering
- Dhalang
- Machinima creators call themselves puppeteers
- UNIMA
- World Puppetry Day
- Kenya Institute of Puppet Theatre (KIPT)
- Sock puppet account
