= KIPT =

KIPT may refer to:

- KIPT (TV), a television station (channel 13 analog/22 digital) licensed to Twin Falls, Idaho, United States
- Williamsport Regional Airport, with ICAO code KIPT
- Kenya Institute of Puppet Theatre (KIPT), a puppetry organization, in Nairobi, Kenya
- Kharkiv Institute of Physics and Technology, a research centre, in Kharkiv, Ukraine
