= Blanice =

Blanice may refer to places in the Czech Republic:

- Blanice (Otava), a river in the South Bohemian Region, tributary of the Otava
- Blanice (Sázava), a river in the Central Bohemian Region, tributary of the Sázava
- Blanice, a village and part of Bavorov in the South Bohemian Region
