= Mollie Falkenstein =

American puppeteer

- Born: Elsie Mary Davidson; 1906; England
- Died: 1992 (aged 85); California, U.S.
- Occupations: Dancer and Puppeteer
- Spouse(s): Aloysius Clair Degenhart (1928–1935); Rudolph Falkenstein (1937)
- Children: 3
- Awards: Trustee’s Award in 1978; UNIMA-USA Citations of Excellence in 1983

Elsie Mary Davidson "Mollie" Peck Falkenstein (1906-1992) was a dancer who became a puppeteer known for her work with finger puppets.

== Biography ==
Mollie Falkenstein was born on March 11, 1906, in Wigan, England as Elsie Mary Davidson to Joseph Thompson Davison, a telegraph clerk, and Minnie Barton, a concert pianist. She was baptized Anglican at St Mary's Church, Lower Ince. She moved to Canada when she was six years old where she began training in ballet. Her parents divorced, and her mother remarried John Peck, a mechanical engineer and widower who had two children from his previous marriage to Agnes Esther Bacon. Falkenstein had her stepfather’s surname added to her own name and her mother gave birth to her half brother, Albert John Peck, in 1915. Falkenstein lived together with her half brother, mother, stepfather, and stepfather's two children at Thrushvale.

In 1922 she moved to Los Angeles and became a professional dancer performing in “Rio Rita” in 1927, before landing a job as a ballerina for Rio Rita on Broadway. In 1928, at age 22, she married Aloysius Clair Degenhart in New York City. Later the same year, she gave birth to his son, Robert Jerome Clair Degenhart in Chicago. The couple moved to California and later divorced in 1935. In 1937, at age 30, she married Rudolph Falkenstein, a German American born in Georgia. She had two children with him, John Brooke Falkenstein and Judith “Jan” Anne Sattler (née Falkenstein). Her first son from her previous marriage adopted his stepfather's surname to become Robert Jerome Falkenstein. Through her son John Brooke Falkenstein, she is the grandmother of animator Jun Falkenstein.

Falkenstein got involved with puppets when her daughter, Jan, was in elementary school and she made a set of puppets and a story to accompany the puppets. This grew over time as the group of children performed in puppet shows with Falkenstein performing as the Chiquita Puppeteers.

Falkenstein also performed a one-woman show with finger puppet ballerinas that would eventually become known as the “dancing ballet.” The ballet puppet dancers had molded legs attached to Falkenstein’s fingers and a head and arms controlled by strings. This technique was later called “Ballerette”.

Falkenstein also worked on puppetry for the community and founded a puppetry guild in Orange County in 1961. Then, in 1964, she was invited to serve as the General Secretary for Union Internationale de la Marionnette - International Puppetry Association (UNIMA). Mrs. Falkenstein attended UNIMA IX Munich 1966, as the USA delegate and then founded the American Chapter of Union Internationale de la Marionnette (UNIMA-USA) in 1966 and began editing the chapter’s magazine APROPOS. Falkenstein would also serve as vice president of UNIMA-USA from 1976-1980.

Falkenstein died in 1992 and, after her death, an exhibit including marionettes, shadow figures, and hand and rod puppets was held at the John Wayne Airport called “Puppets for Mollie” to honor Falkenstein.

== Awards and honors ==
In 1978 Falkenstein received the Trustee’s Award from the Puppeteers of America. UNIMA-USA presented her with a citation of excellence in 1983, and she was named an honorary member of UNIMA.
