= Jindřich Veselý =

Czech puppeteer

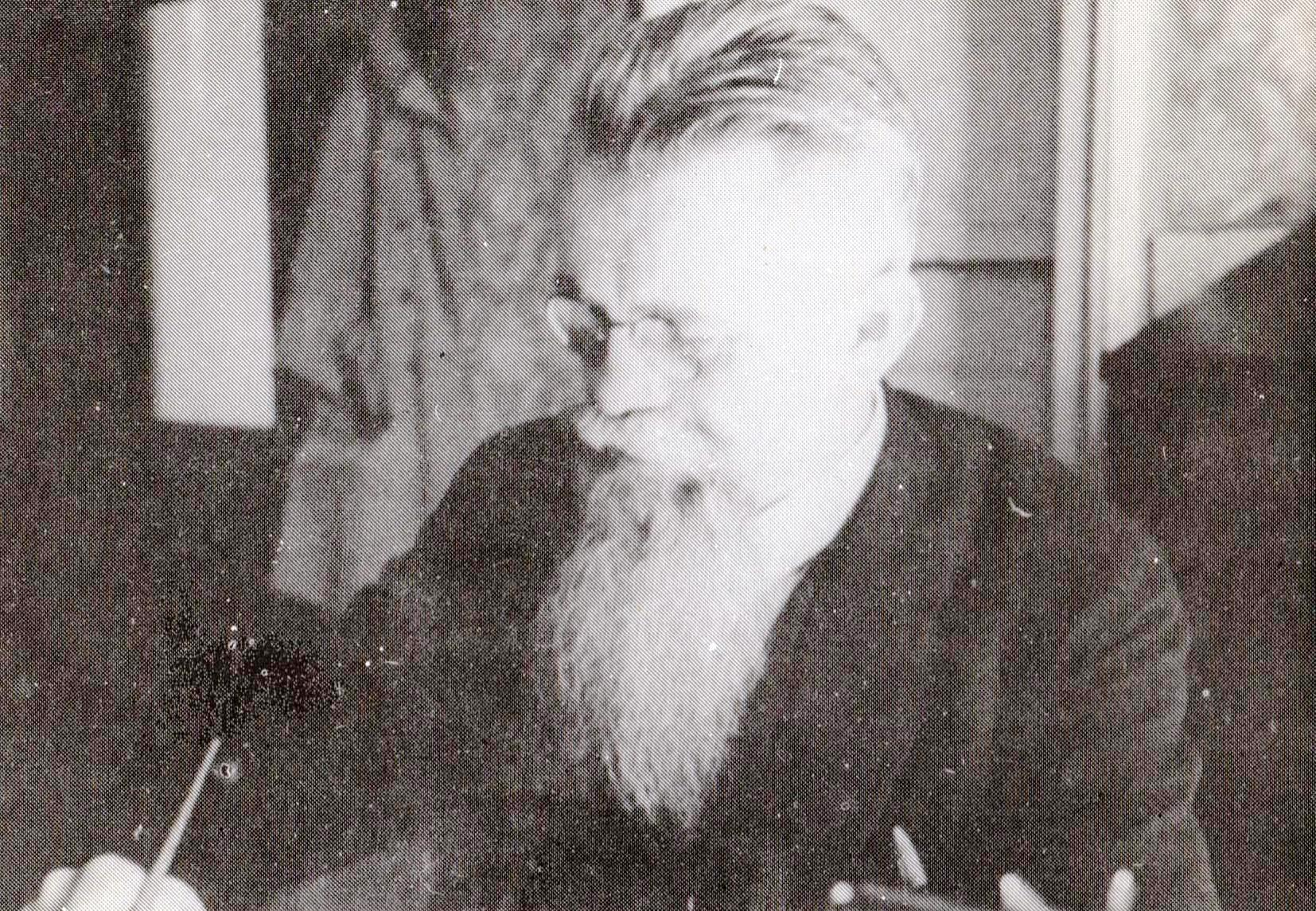
- Jindřich Veselý in c. 1939
- Born: 15 July 1885; Bavorov, Bohemia, Austrian Empire
- Died: 19 September 1939 (aged 54); České Budějovice, Protectorate of Bohemia and Moravia
- Education: Faculty of Arts, Charles University in Prague
- Occupations: Pedagogue, publicist, historian, writer
- Writing career
- Genre: Puppetry
- Notable work: Kašpárek a princezna

Jindřich Veselý (15 June 1885 – 19 September 1939) was a Czech pedagogue, publicist, historian on the field of puppetry and author of puppet theatre plays.

== Early life and education ==
Veselý was born in Bavorov to a family of a pedagogue. He graduated from the gymnasium in České Budějovice, then studied Czech and German philology at Charles University, where he gained interest in puppet theatre.

From 1909 to 1935, Veselý worked as a high school teacher in Prague and Kladno, since 1935/36 he was the director of gymnasium in České Budějovice.

== Puppetry ==
Veselý devoted all his interest to puppet theatre. Originally he collected puppets, texts of traditional puppet plays and documents on the activities of folk puppeteers. Later, he focused on contemporary amateur puppet theatre and became one of the most important promoters of puppet theatre and organizers of the puppet movement. He organized a puppet exhibition in 1911 and co-organized exhibitions in 1921, 1924 and 1929.

In 1911, he co-founded the Czech Association of Friends of Puppet Theatre and advocated the publication of the union magazine Český loutkář, which was published in his editorial office in 1912–1913 and was the first specialized puppet magazine in the world. After the World War I the publishing has been resumed under a new name Loutkář and continued until 1939. It is published with a break from both world wars from 1912 until today and is the oldest specialist puppet-theatre magazine in the world.

He also supported the serial production of puppets and decorations for puppet theatres by Antonín Münzberg. This production and publication of magazine contributed to the fact that Czechoslovakia began to be called "paradise of puppet theatre".

Veselý played a key role in founding UNIMA (International Puppetry Association) in 1929 in Prague, and was elected its first president. When Josef Skupa took office in 1933, Veselý was awarded the title of honorary president for life.

=== Work ===
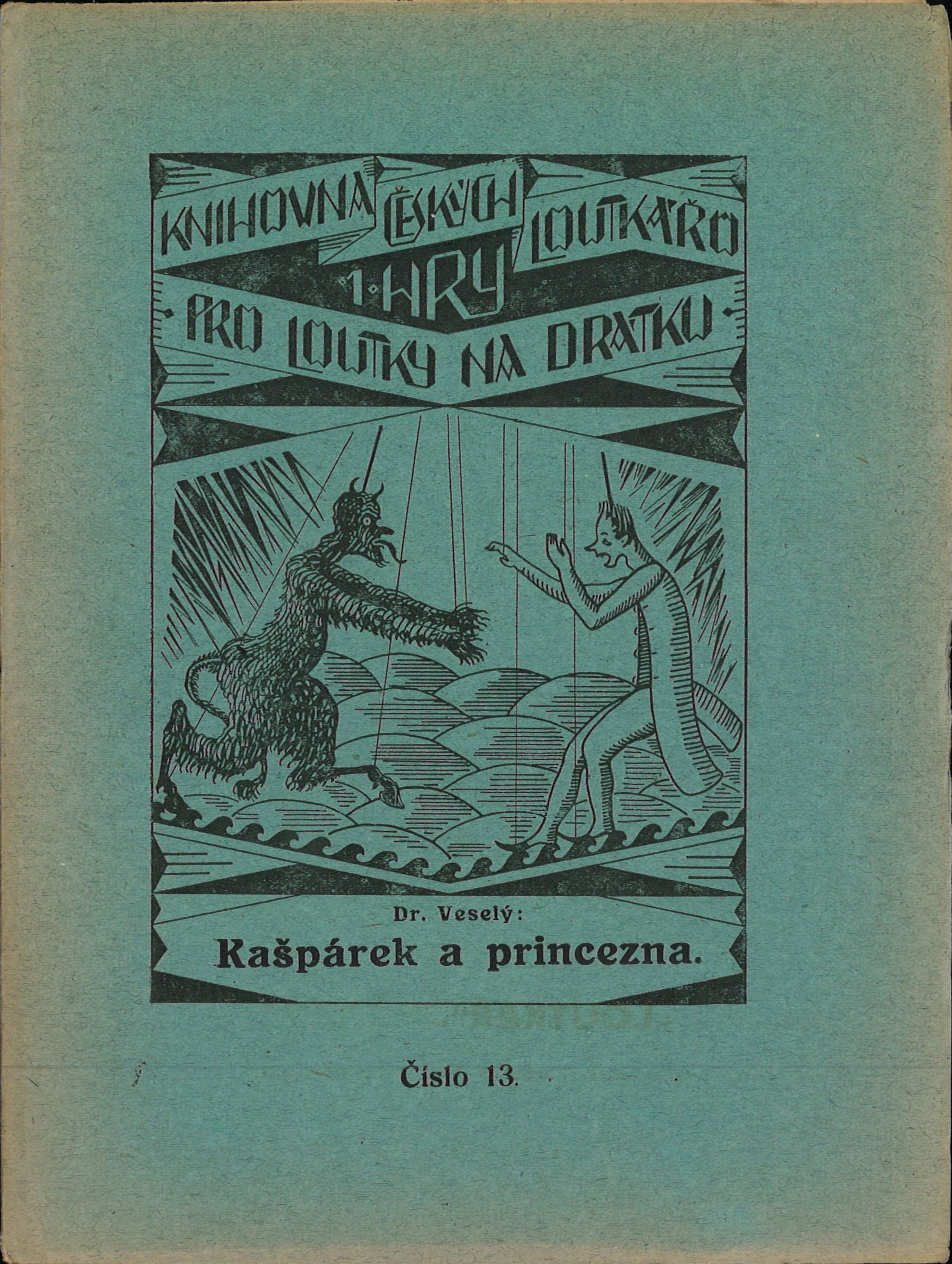
Kašpárek a princezna cover

In 1920 or 1921, his most famous puppet theatre play Kašpárek a princezna ("Kasperle and Princess") was published, which is still being played today. It was also printed in the printer of Loutkář magazine. Veselý also published professional works on the history of puppet theatre, puppet theatre manuals and collections of puppet theatre plays.

== Other interests ==
Veselý also contributed to literary-historical and educational work, focusing especially on the writers of his home region, the South Bohemian Region. He is the author of monograph on life and work of Svatopluk Čech.
