= The Key Theatre =

Theatre companies in Israel

- תיאטרון המפתח
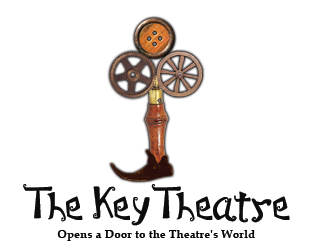
- Address: Tel Aviv; Israel

Construction
- Opened: 1998; 28 years ago

Website
- www.key-theatre.com

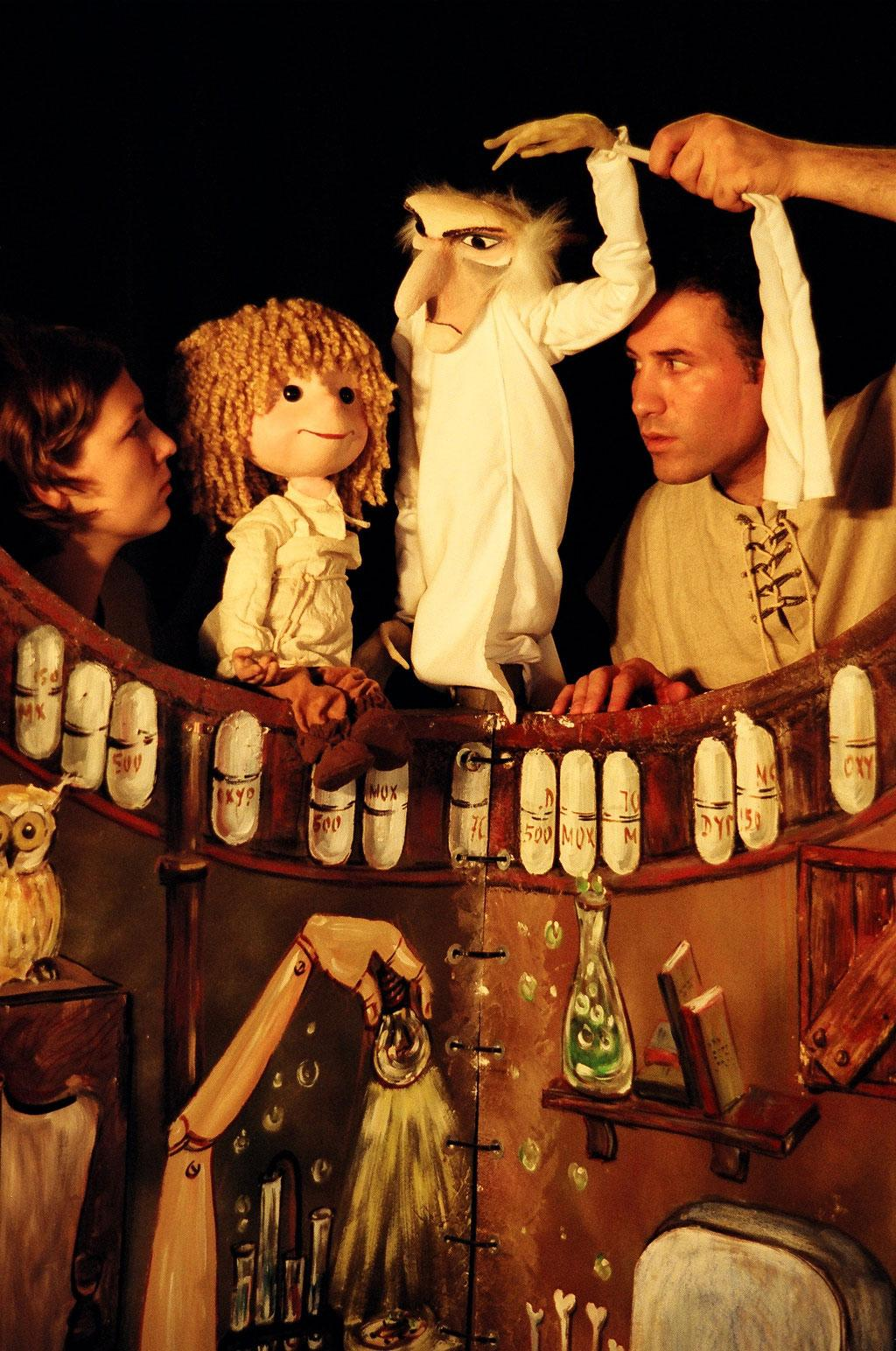
"The Boy who had no Fear"

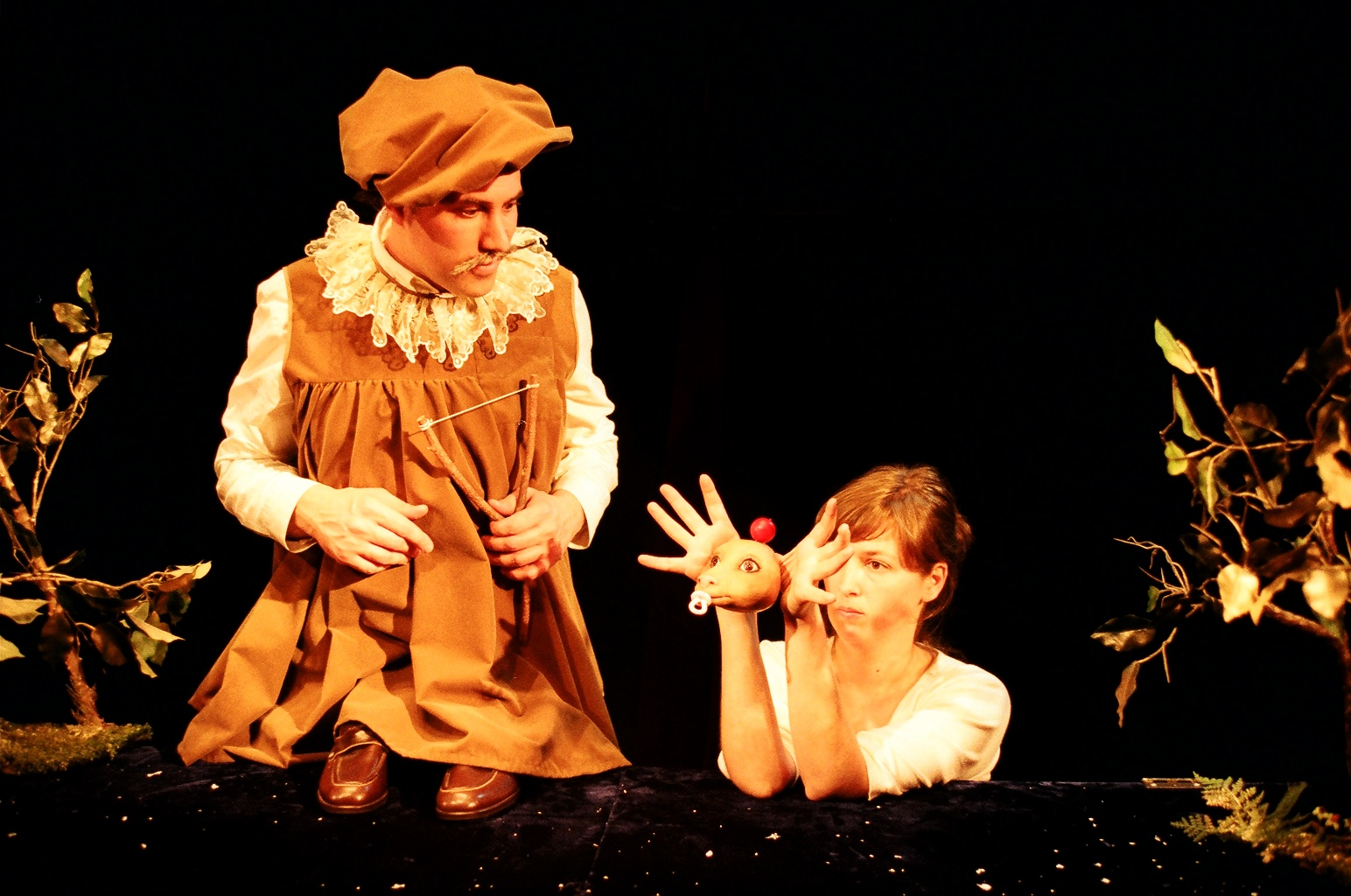
"Baron Munchausen"

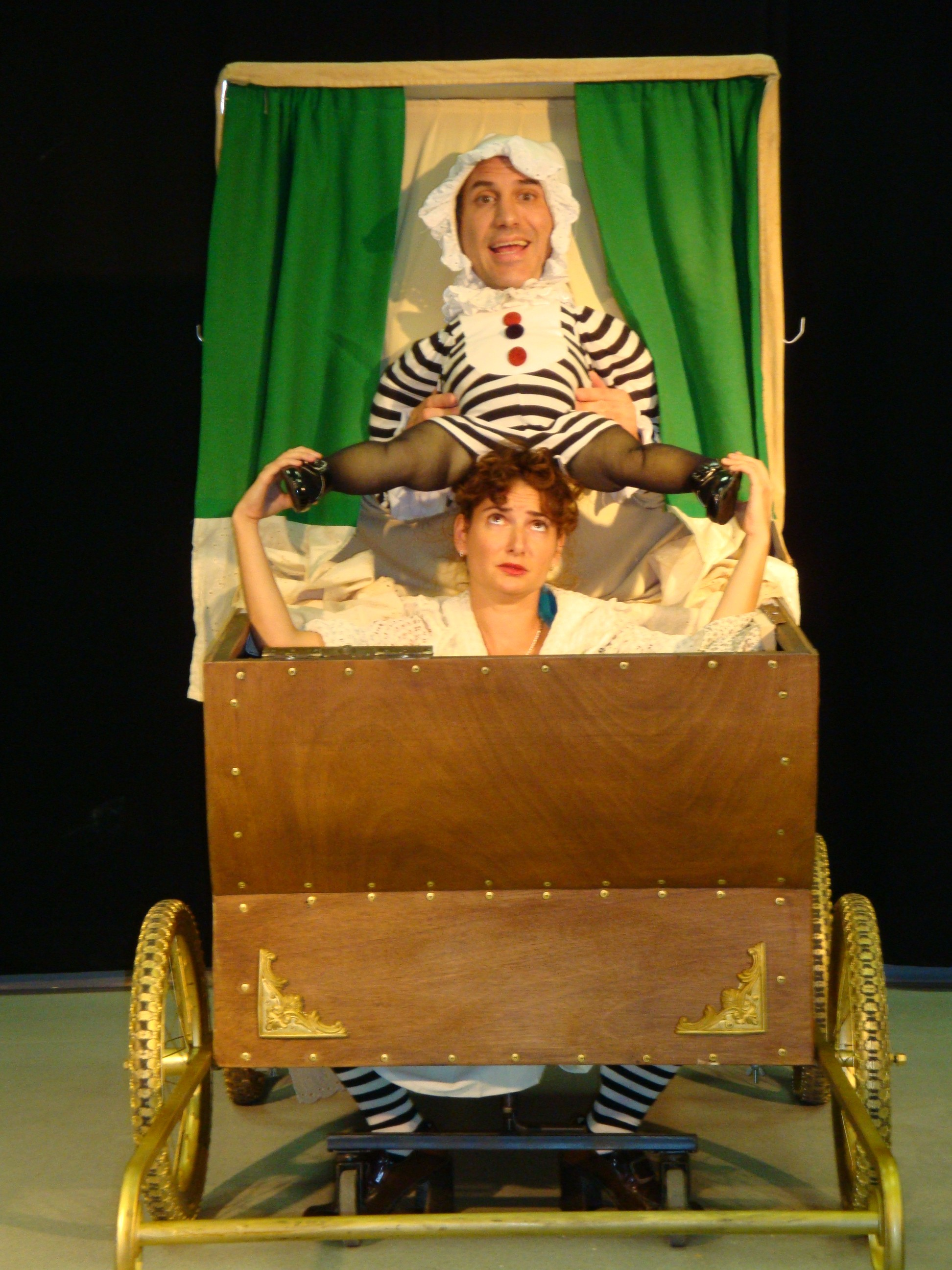
"El BeBE"

The Key Theatre is an Israeli visual children's theatre established in 1998.

== History ==
The Theatre is a collaboration between theatre actor Avi Zlicha, who previously played in Haifa Theatre and throughout the years specialized in physical theatre by Jacques Lecoq`s method, and Dikla Katz, a playwright and puppeteer, who wrote for Arutz HaYeladim (the Israeli "Children Channel"). Both Zlicha and Katz are graduates of Tel Aviv University, of the Theater department and the Film and TV department respectively. Combining film and theater has led to the creation of a company that employs different theatrical languages for each show.

Throughout the years, the Key Theatre has collaborated on projects with the Israeli Chamber Orchestra, the Renaissance Festival, Haifa Festival, the National Maritime Museum, the Tel-Aviv Museum of Art and many more. It is a member of ASSITEJ and UNIMA. In 2015 Dikla Katz was nominated as the official representative of UNIMA in Israel.

The Key Theatre also performs around the world. It has performed with "Baron Munchausen" in Vietnam and Kazakhstan (2012), and with "When all was Green" in Macedonia, Senegal, South Korea, Bulgaria (2014), Armenia, Italy (EXPO), Taiwan, Slovenia, Japan, Kosovo, Norway, Poland (2015), Belarus, Slovakia, Thailand, Myanmar, India, Montenegro, Croatia and Romania (2016).

== Plays ==
- 1998 - "Treasure Island" - Object Theatre based on R. L. Stevenson`s Book
- 2000 - "The Orange Shoe" - A Commedia dell'arte musical show
- 2002 - "The Boy who had no Fear" – A tale inspired by the Grimm Brothers using puppetry and paper pop-up
- 2005 - "Baron Munchausen" - A cabaret for two actors and puppets
- 2007 - "El BeBE" - Vaudeville on wheels for two actors and sock puppets
- 2009 - "The Gigantic Turnip" - A Toy Theatre Russian folktale
- 2012 - "When all was Green" - A puppetry play without words inspired by "The Giving Tree" and "The Lorax"

== Awards ==
All awards are for "When All was Green":

- Best Music Award in Children's Theatre by ASSITEJ Israel 2013
- "Golden Dolphin" Award for worthy debuting - The IPF Golden Dolphin Festival, Varna, Bulgaria 2014
- Children's Jury Award - International Puppet Theatres Festival, Katowice, Poland 2015
- Children's Jury Award - VIRVAR International Puppet Festival, Kosice, Slovakia 2016
- Grand Prix Award and Dramaturgy Award - Medunarodni Festival Lutkarstva, Podgorica, Montenegro 2016
- "Tibor Sekelj" Award for the production with the most humane message - The 49th PIF Festival, Zagreb, Croatia 2016
- Original Structure for the Poetic World Award – Tandarica Festival, Bucharest, Romania 2016
