= Bavorov =

Town in the Czech Republic

- Town
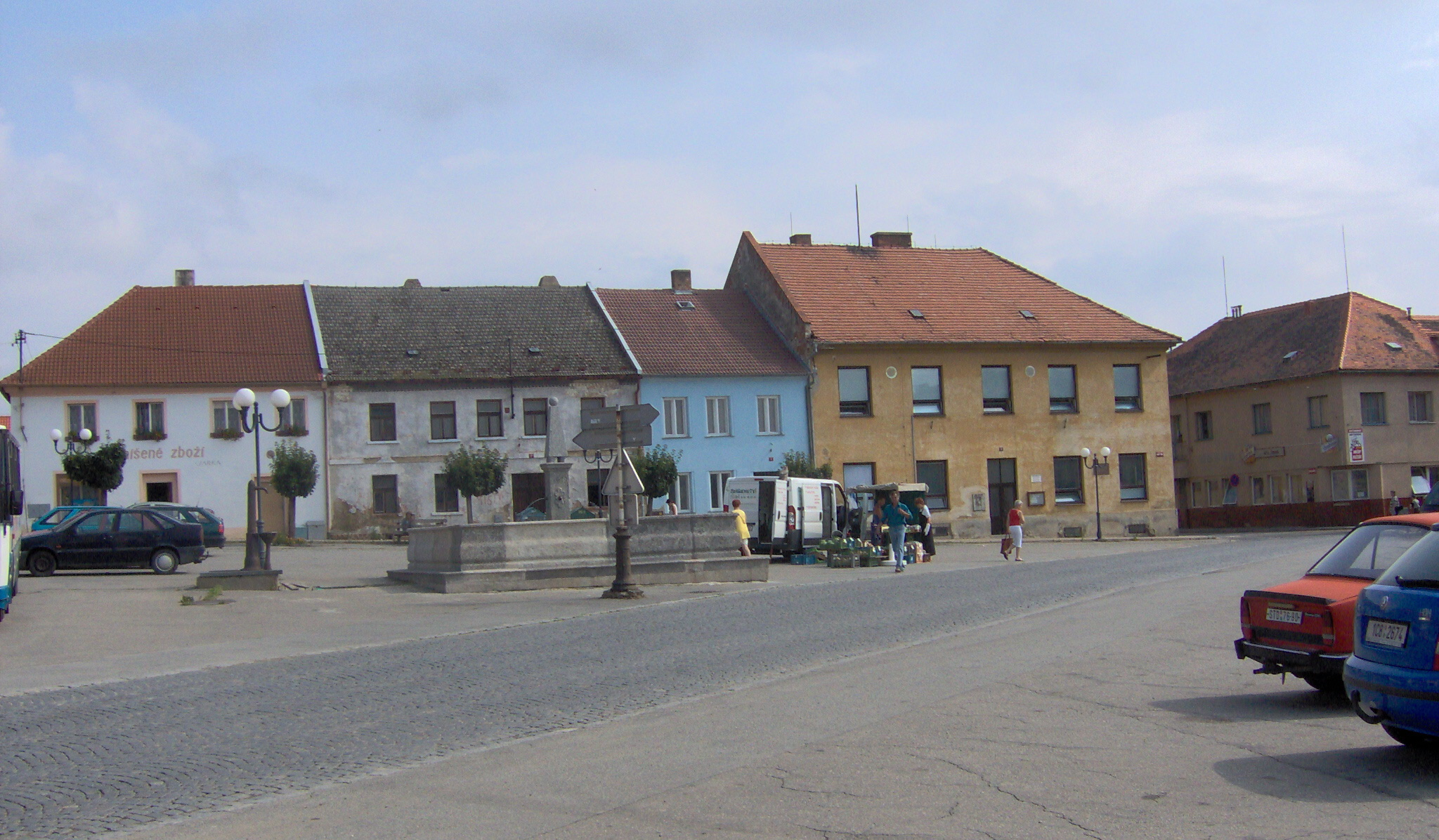
- Town centre

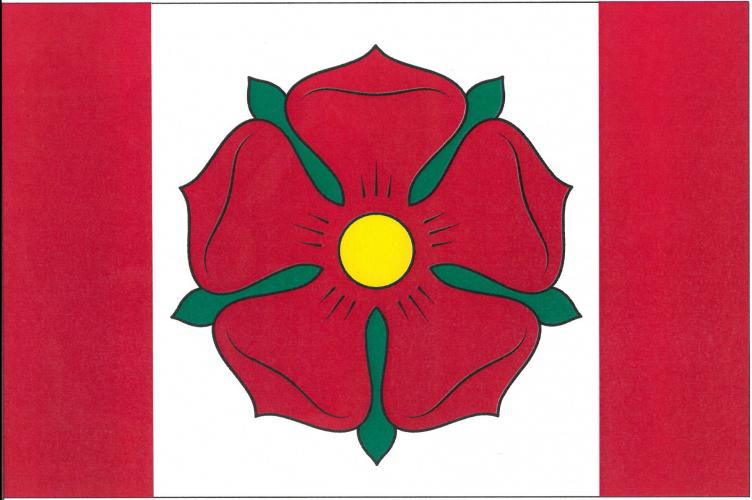
- Flag Coat of arms

- Location in the Czech Republic
- Coordinates: 49°7′19″N 14°4′44″E
- Country: Czech Republic
- Region: South Bohemian
- District: Strakonice
- First mentioned: 1228

Government
  - Mayor: Petr Šafránek

Area
  - Total: 35.41 km^{2} (13.67 sq mi)
- Elevation: 446 m (1,463 ft)

Population (2026-01-01)
  - Total: 1,672
  - Density: 47.22/km^{2} (122.3/sq mi)
- Time zone: UTC+1 (CET)
  - Summer (DST): UTC+2 (CEST)
- Postal code: 387 73
- Website: www.mestobavorov.cz

Bavorov (Czech pronunciation: [ˈbavorof]; German: Barau) is a town in Strakonice District in the South Bohemian Region of the Czech Republic. It has about 1,700 inhabitants. The town is located on the Blanice River in the Bohemian Forest Foothills. The historic town centre is well preserved and is protected as an urban monument zone. The main landmark of Bavorov is the Church of the Assumption of the Virgin Mary.

== Administrative division ==
Bavorov consists of six municipal parts (in brackets population according to the 2021 census):

- Bavorov (1,296)
- Blanice (13)
- Čichtice (128)
- Svinětice (104)
- Tourov (41)
- Útěšov (32)

== Etymology ==
Bavorov was named after its founders, noblemen Bavors of Strakonice.

== Geography ==
Bavorov is located about 19 kilometres (12 mi) southeast of Strakonice and 32 km (20 mi) northwest of České Budějovice. It lies in the Bohemian Forest Foothills. The highest point is the hill Svobodná hora at 640 m (2,100 ft) above sea level, located on the eastern municipal border. The Blanice River flows through the municipality. There are several fishponds in the municipality, the largest of which are Rozboud, Bašta and Hluboký rybník.

== History ==
The first written mention of Bavorov is from 1228. The town was founded by the Bavor of Strakonice family. The most important for the town was Jan Bavor III, who settled in Bavorov in 1315 and who had built the square and the surrounding streets.

In 1351, the Rosenberg family acquired Bavorov. Bavorov was the seat of the estate until 1355, when the Helfenburk Castle was built. The Rosenberg family owned the town until 1593, when Peter Vok of Rosenberg sold all the Helfenburk estate to Prachatice. After the Battle of White Mountain, properties of Prachatice were confiscated, and in 1621 the royal chamber donated Bavorov to the Eggenberg family. In 1719, the Schwarzenberg family inherited the town.

== Demographics ==
Historical population

Year	Pop.	±%
1869	3,120	—
1880	3,365	+7.9%
1890	3,079	−8.5%
1900	3,113	+1.1%
1910	3,057	−1.8%

Year	Pop.	±%
1921	2,966	−3.0%
1930	2,586	−12.8%
1950	2,057	−20.5%
1961	2,027	−1.5%
1970	1,760	−13.2%

Year	Pop.	±%
1980	1,670	−5.1%
1991	1,475	−11.7%
2001	1,436	−2.6%
2011	1,499	+4.4%
2021	1,614	+7.7%

Source: Censuses

== Economy ==
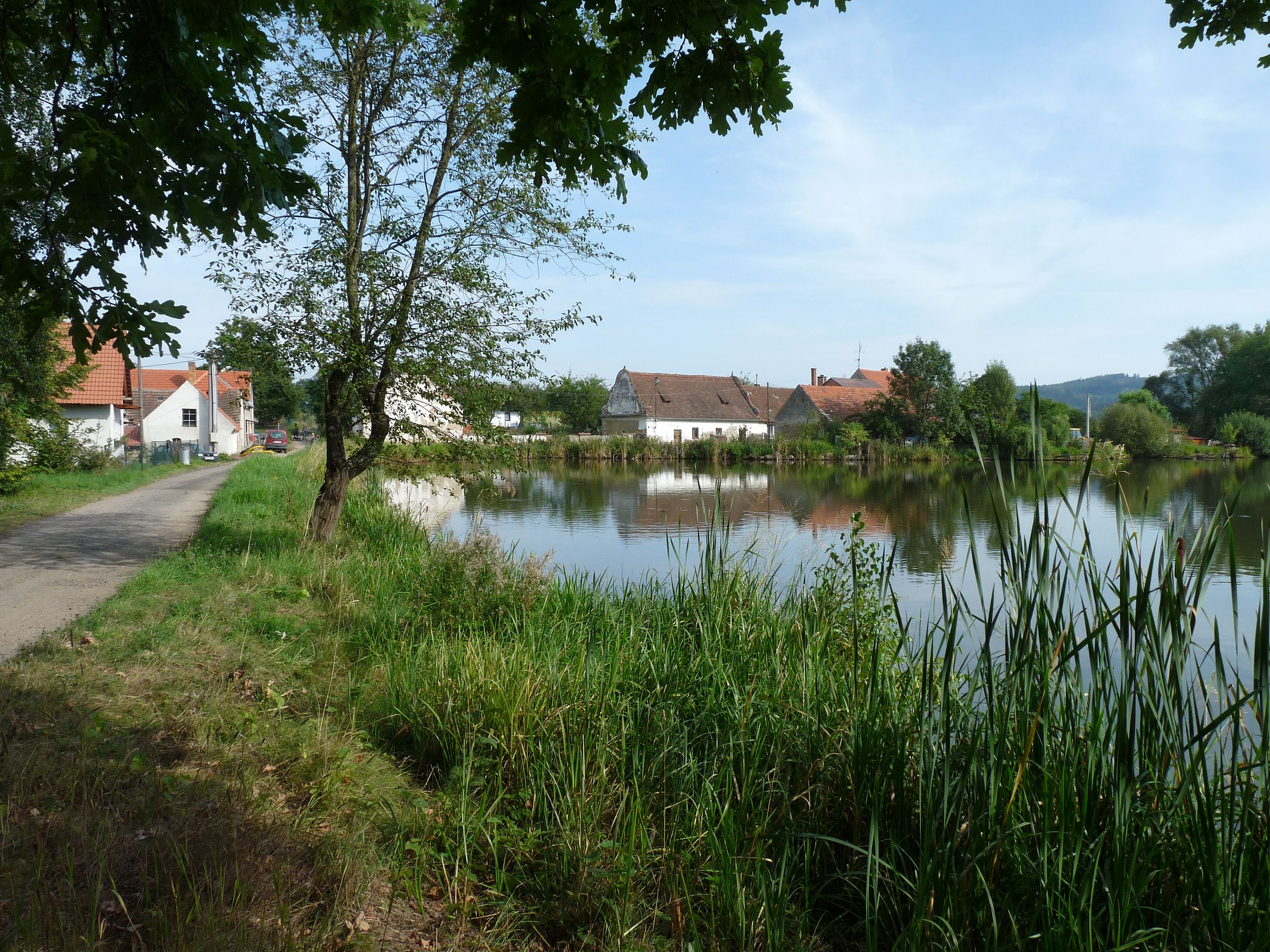
Bašta Pond in Čichtice

The town is mainly known for its strawberry production, which began here in 1991.

== Transport ==
Bavorov is located on the railway line Číčenice–Stožec-Nové Údolí. There are two train stations: Bavorov and Svinětice. The third station which serves the territory, Blanice, lies beyond the borders of the municipality.

== Sights ==
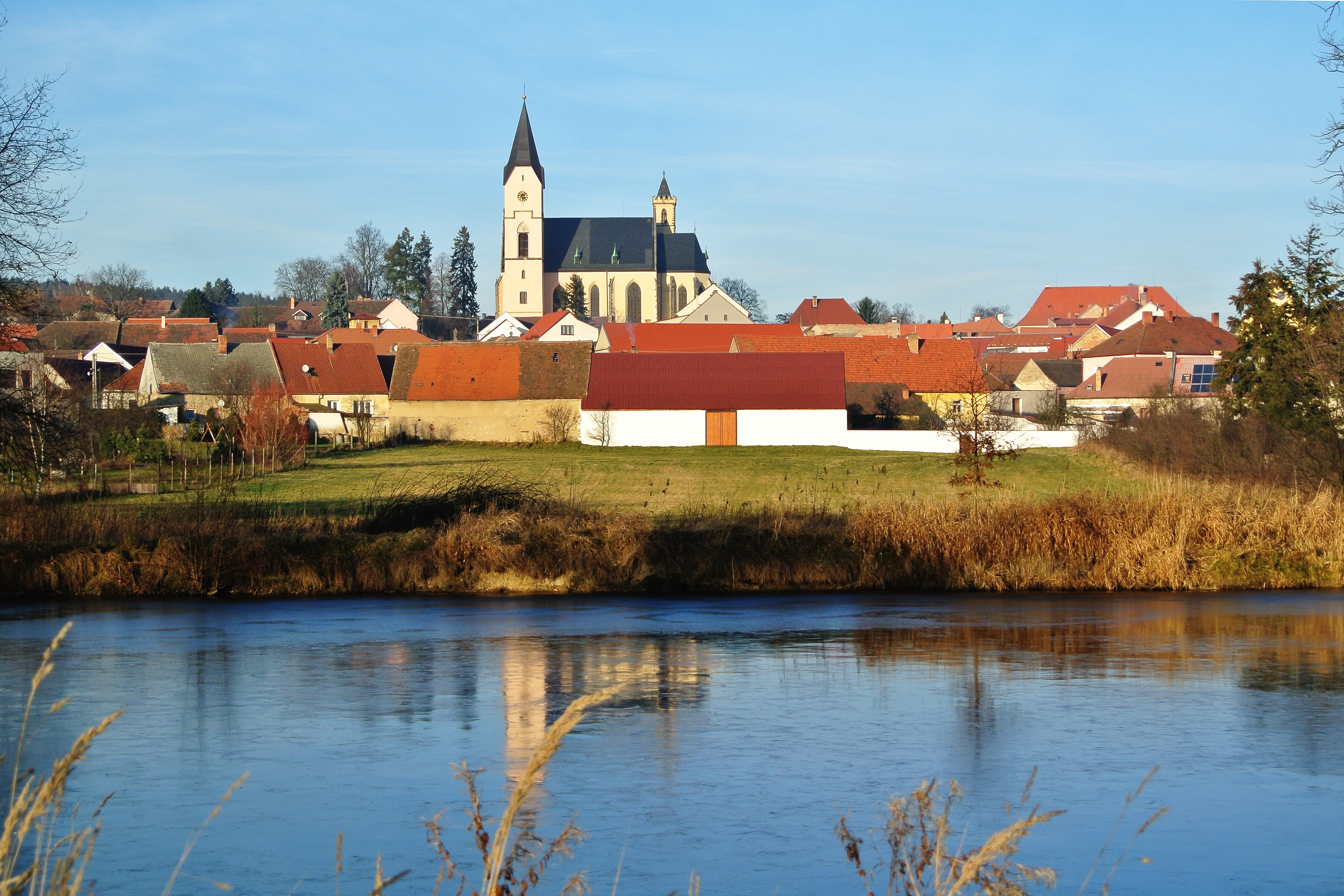
View of Bavorov over the Kotlík pond

The most valuable building in Bavorov is the Church of the Assumption of the Virgin Mary. It is one of the most important South Bohemian Gothic buildings. The church was built in 1360–1384 and replaced an older church, which stood here in 1350 at the latest.

The historic centre of Bavorov is the square Náměstí Míru, which is in the shape of a regular square typical of the South Bohemian Region. The former manor house, locally called "The Castle", is a Baroque building that dominates the square. In the centre of the square is a fountain built in 1742.

Small Worlds is a museum of dollshouses, models and other tiny toys. It is open during the summer months and for special events.

The most valuable technical monument is a water mill with unique hydroelectric power plant. The mill was built in the first half of the 19th century and the power plant dates from the 1930s.

== Notable people ==
- Jindřich Veselý (1885–1939), historian of puppetry and founder of UNIMA

== Gallery ==
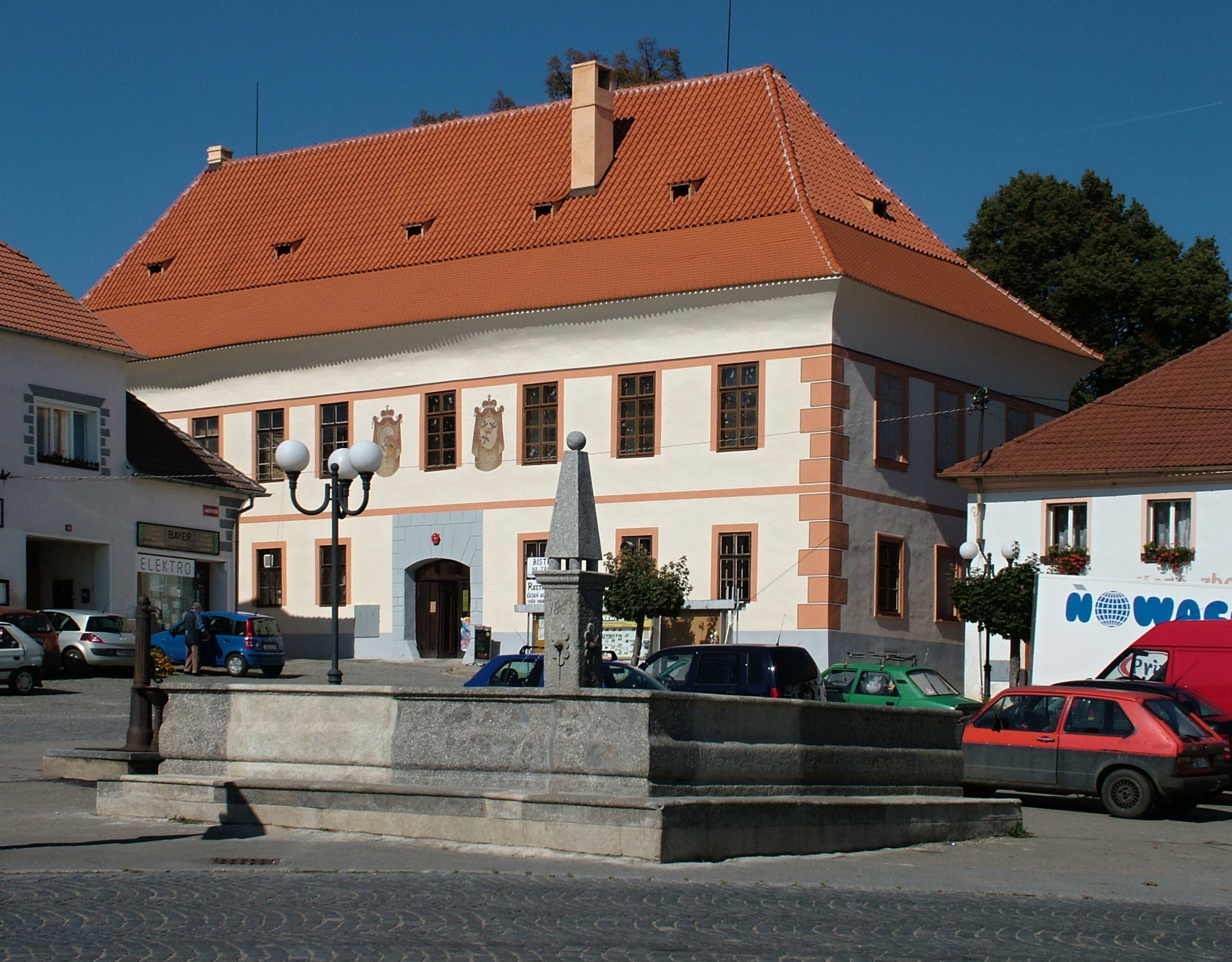
Town square with the manor house and fountain

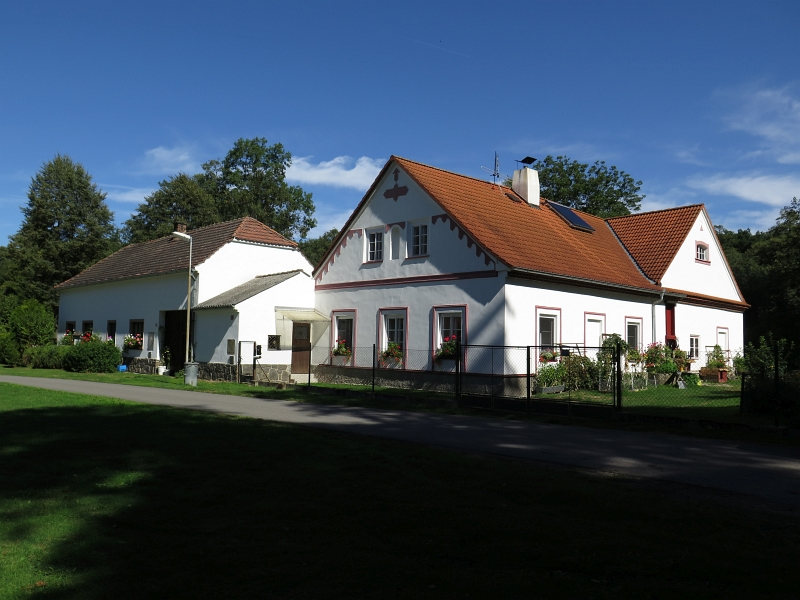
Water mill and power plant

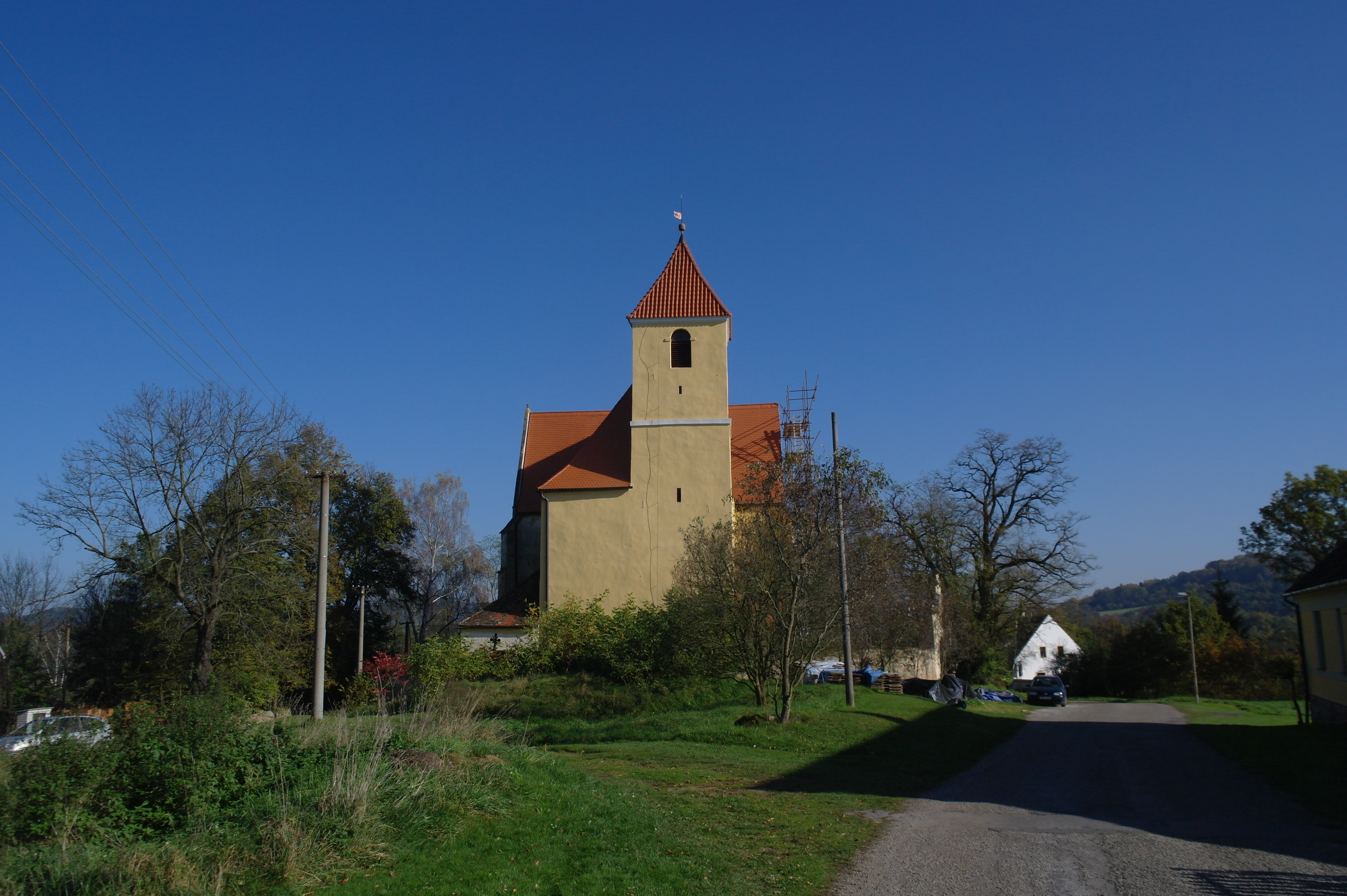
Church of Saint Giles in Blanice

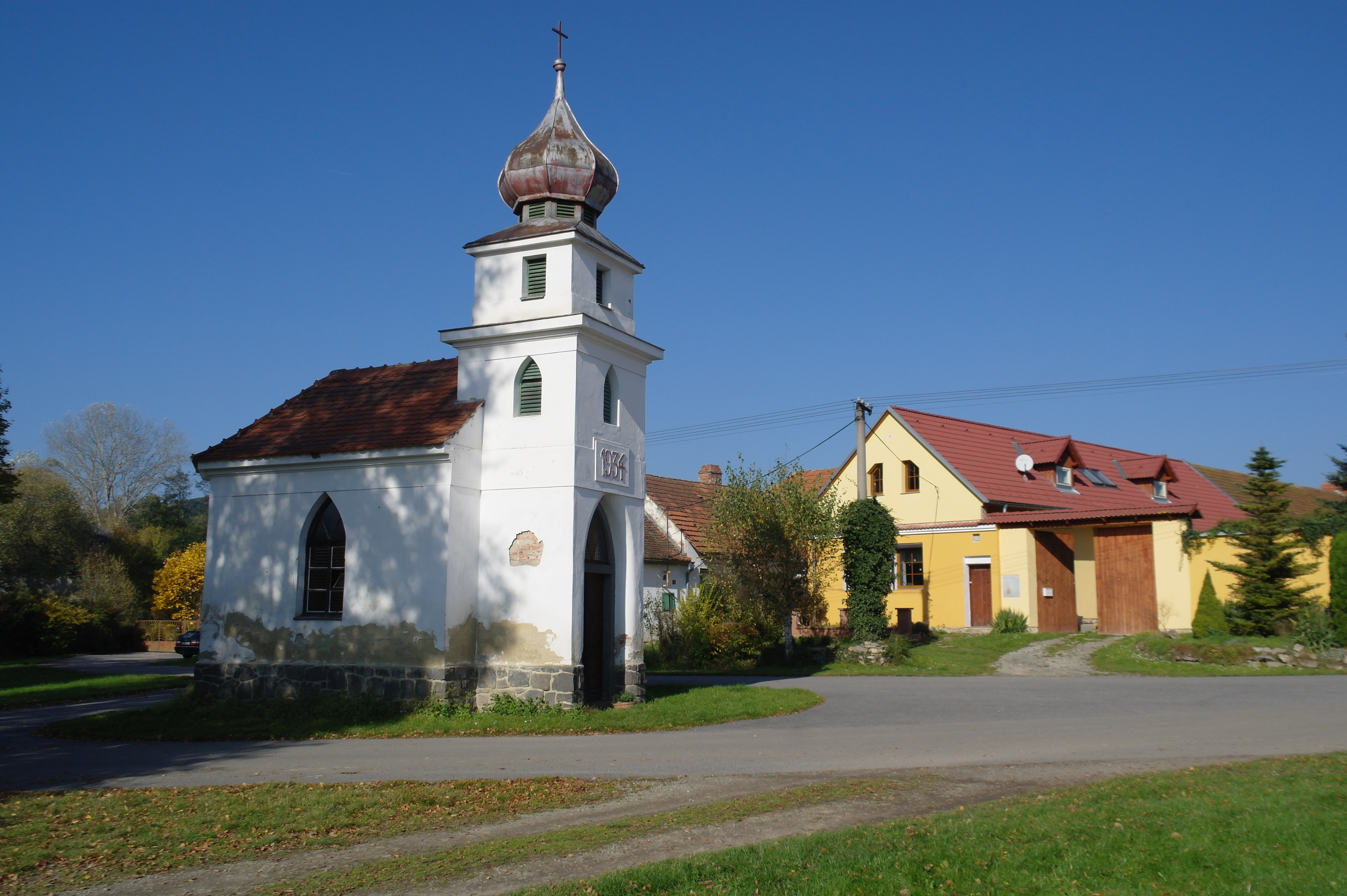
Chapel on the common in Svinětice

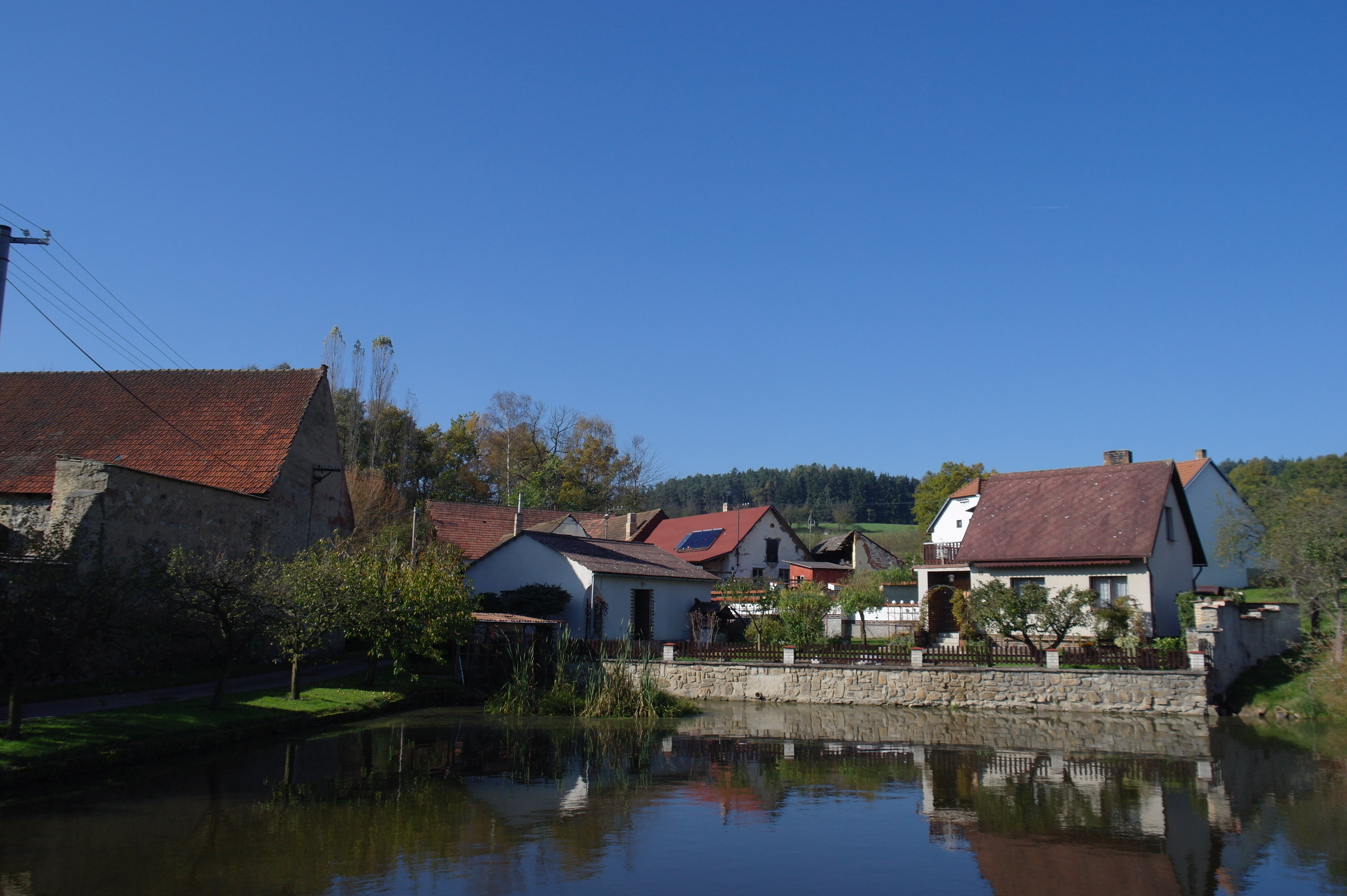
A pond in the centre of Tourov

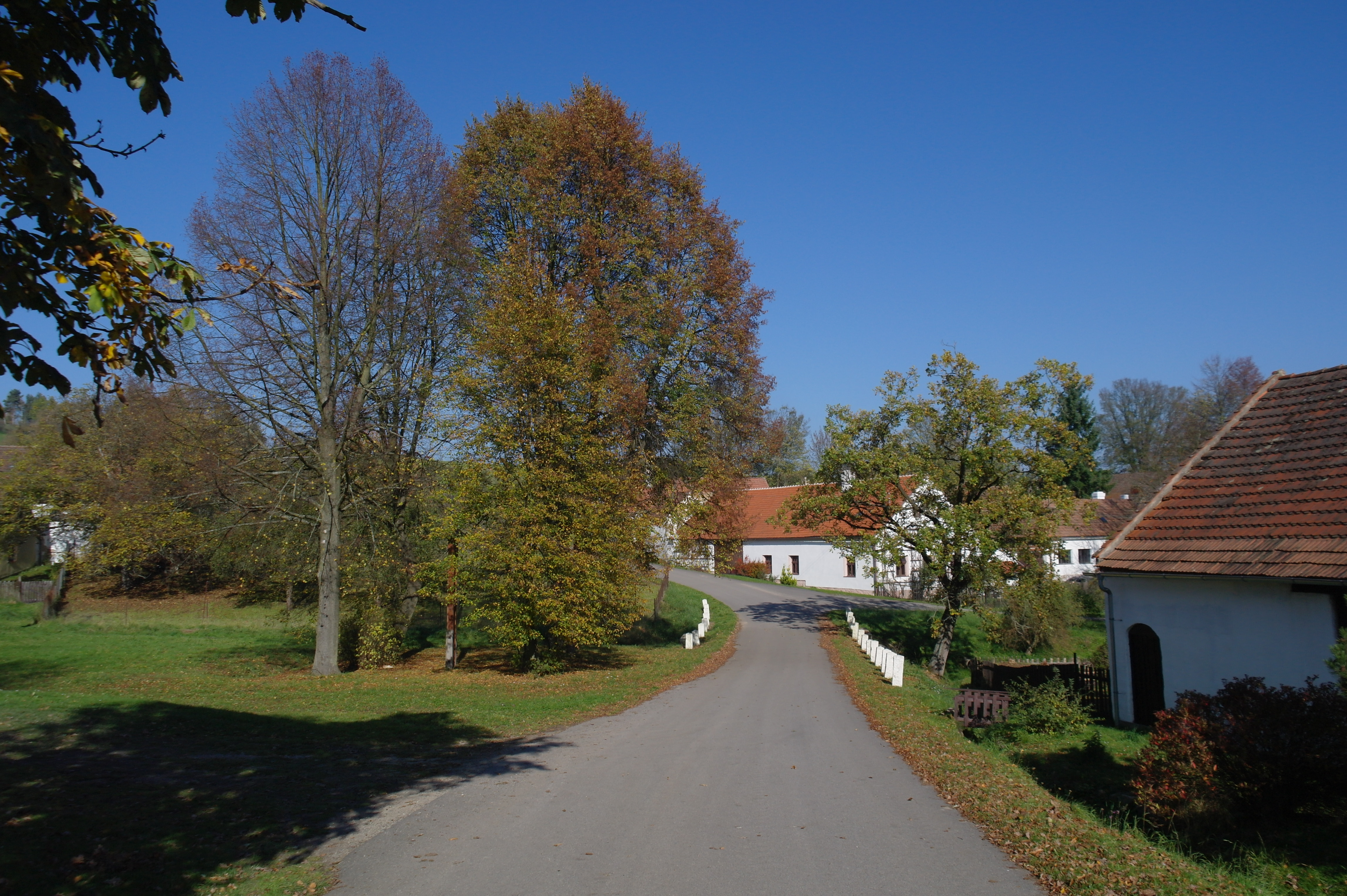
Útěšov
