= Jun Falkenstein =

American film director

- Born: Laguna Beach, California
- Education: University of Southern California (BA)
- Occupations: Screenwriter, animation director, storyboard artist
- Years active: 1990–present

Jun Aimeo Falkenstein is an American animation director, writer, and storyboard artist. She directed the film The Tigger Movie in 2000. Falkenstein graduated from the USC School of Cinematic Arts with a bachelors in live-action production (Note: Though most of her student films were cel animation) in 1991.

== Personal life ==
Jun Aimeo Falkenstein was born in Hawaii and raised in Laguna Beach, California. Her father, John Brooke Falkenstein (born 1940), was an engineer who worked at the Orange County Sanitation District. He is of German and English descent and the second son of puppeteer Mollie Falkenstein. Her mother, Hiroko Trust Falkenstein (born 1942), was a piano teacher and writer who immigrated to the United States from Japan. Jun Falkenstein has a younger brother, Brook Falkenstein (born 1971), who is the director of technical services at the University of California, San Diego. Falkenstein's parents eventually divorced due to her father's infidelity. Her mother remarried Gregg Stone, a painter. Her father remarried Hanh Do but filed for divorce in 2020.

== Film and television work ==
- Taz-Mania (1992) - Animation posing artist
- Scooby-Doo! in Arabian Nights (1994) - Director
- Pocahontas II: Journey to a New World (1998) - Storyboard artist
- A Winnie the Pooh Thanksgiving (1998) - Director
- Seasons of Giving (1999) - Director
- Mickey's Once Upon a Christmas (1999) - Director
- The Tigger Movie (2000) - Director, writer
- Johnny Test (2005–2006) - Storyboard artist
- Random! Cartoons (2007) - Creator ("Kyle + Rosemary")
- The Jungle Book (2014) - Director
- Monster High: Great Scarrier Reef (2016) - Supervising director
- Monster High: Welcome to Monster High (2016) - Supervising director
- Monster High: Electrified (2017) - Supervising director
- The Lion King (2019) - Storyboard artist
- Stillwater (2020) - Executive producer, supervising director

== Awards and nominations ==
- Emmy Award (Winner)

for "Outstanding Directing for a Preschool Animated Program - Stillwater (2022)"
Jun Falkenstein, Supervising Director

- Peabody Award (Winner)

for "Children's and Youth category - Stillwater (2020)"
Jun Falkenstein, Supervising Director

- Annie Award (Nominated)

for "Outstanding Individual Achievement for Directing in an Animated Feature Production - The Tigger Movie (2000)"
Jun Falkenstein, Director
