= Helfenburk =

Coordinates: 49°08′10″N 14°00′23″E

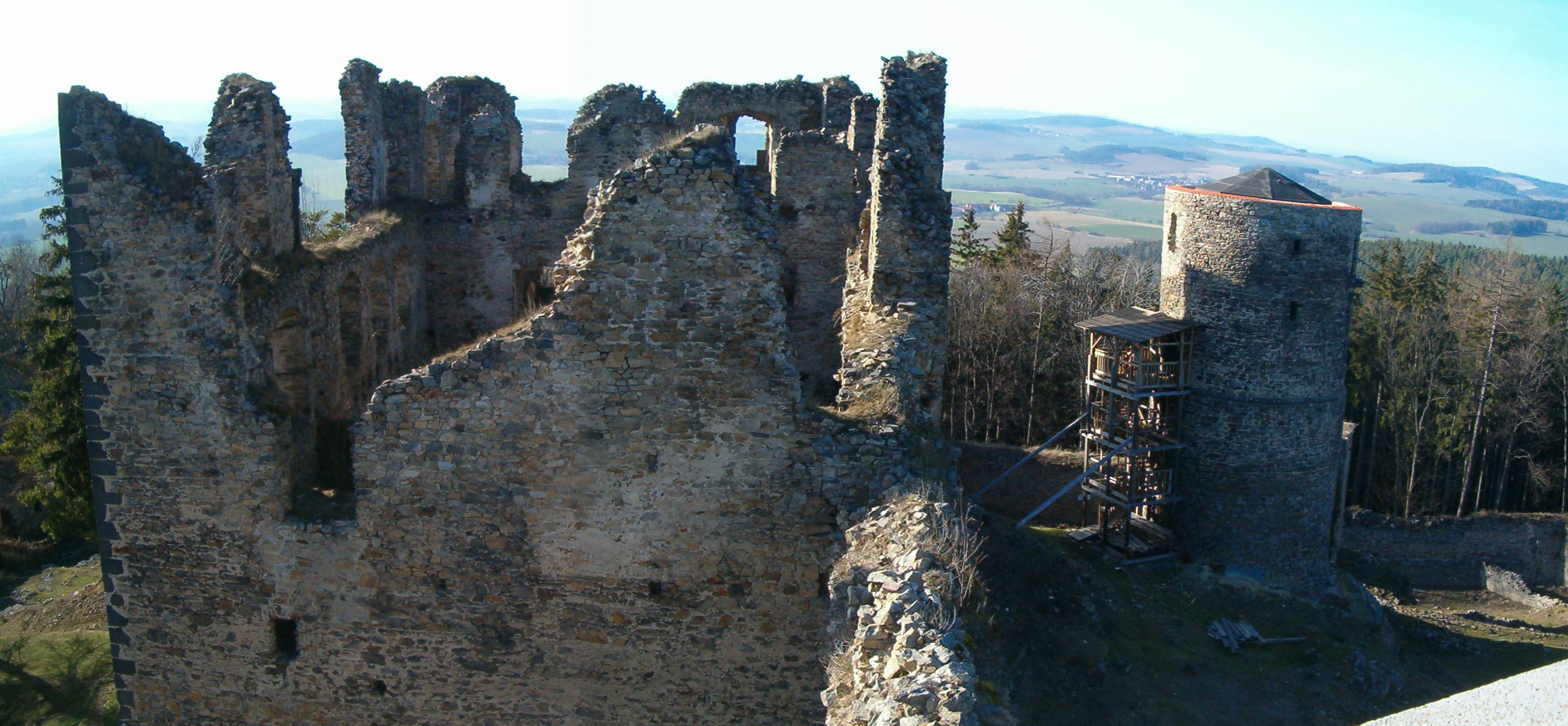
Helfenburk

Helfenburk is a castle ruin in the municipality of Krajníčko, 5.5 kilometres (3.4 mi) from the town of Bavorov in the South Bohemian Region of the Czech Republic. It is situated on Malošín stone hill at an altitude of 683 metres (2,241 ft). Between the municipalities of Koječín and Štětín there is a paved road that leads to the castle.

== History ==
In 1355, a town was built by members of the Rožemberk family to defend the nearby town of Bavorov. There were four brothers – Peter, Jošt, Oldřich and Jan of Rožemberk. Building permission was given by King Charles IV. It was a reward for their services, due to them having accompanied the King on his journey to the coronation in Rome. In the year 1381, Bavorov was given the rights of a free town.

After the death of Jan in 1389 and his brother Oldřich, Jan's son Jindřich III of Rožemberk became the owner of the castle. He was one of the opponents of King Václav IV. The King was trying to harm him as much as he could, allegedly even with help of Jan Žižka.

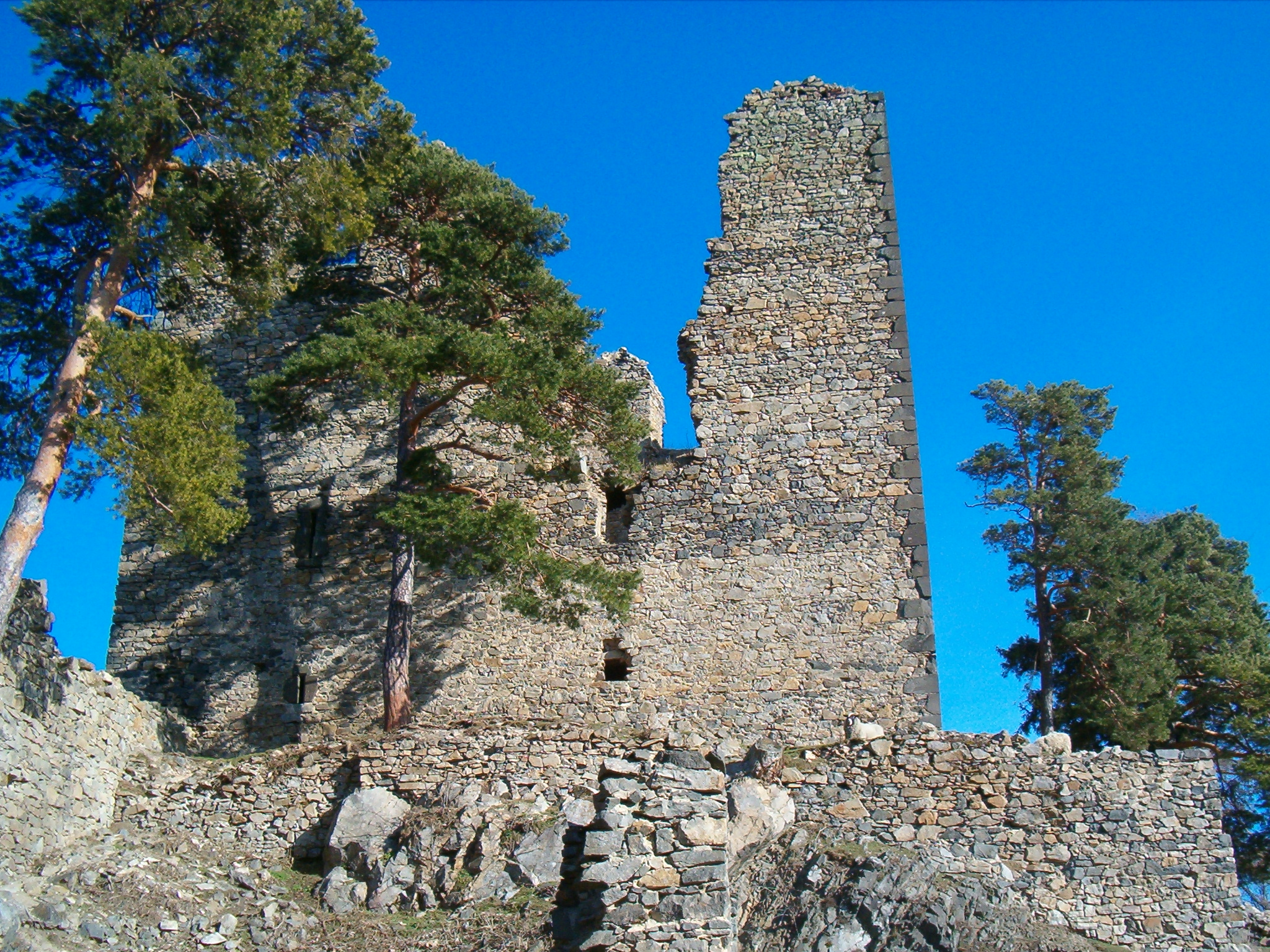
Helfenburk

After Jindřich III's death, Oldřich II of Rožemberk, son of Oldřich, became the owner of the castle. He was very young and was tutored by Čeněk from Vartemberk. He later converted to Catholicism and was raised in this religion. After the defeat of the Hussites in Tábor, he ordered the arrest of Hussite priests in all of his lands, and imprisoned them in his castles. It is proved that at Helfenburk two Hussite priests died.

After the death of Oldřich II, the ruler of the castle was his son Jindřich IV of Rožemberk, and after him Jan II. Both constantly had problems with money and debts, which had been incurred by their father's war costs. The castle was given as a guarantee to Přeškov from Čestice. The contract allowed free access to the castles by former owners. After his death the castle was bought out and returned to the Rožemberk family.

The period from 1468 to 1472 was troublesome around the castle. There were neighbourly disputes between Rožemberk and the towns of Písek, Sušice and Vodňany. The castle did not face such big losses, but these disputes also affected neighbouring villages.

After the death Jan of Rožemberk and subsequent death of his son Jindrich V, ownership of the castle went to Vok II of Rožemberk. Because of dues he sold the castle to the brothers Václav and Zikmund Vlček of Čenov.

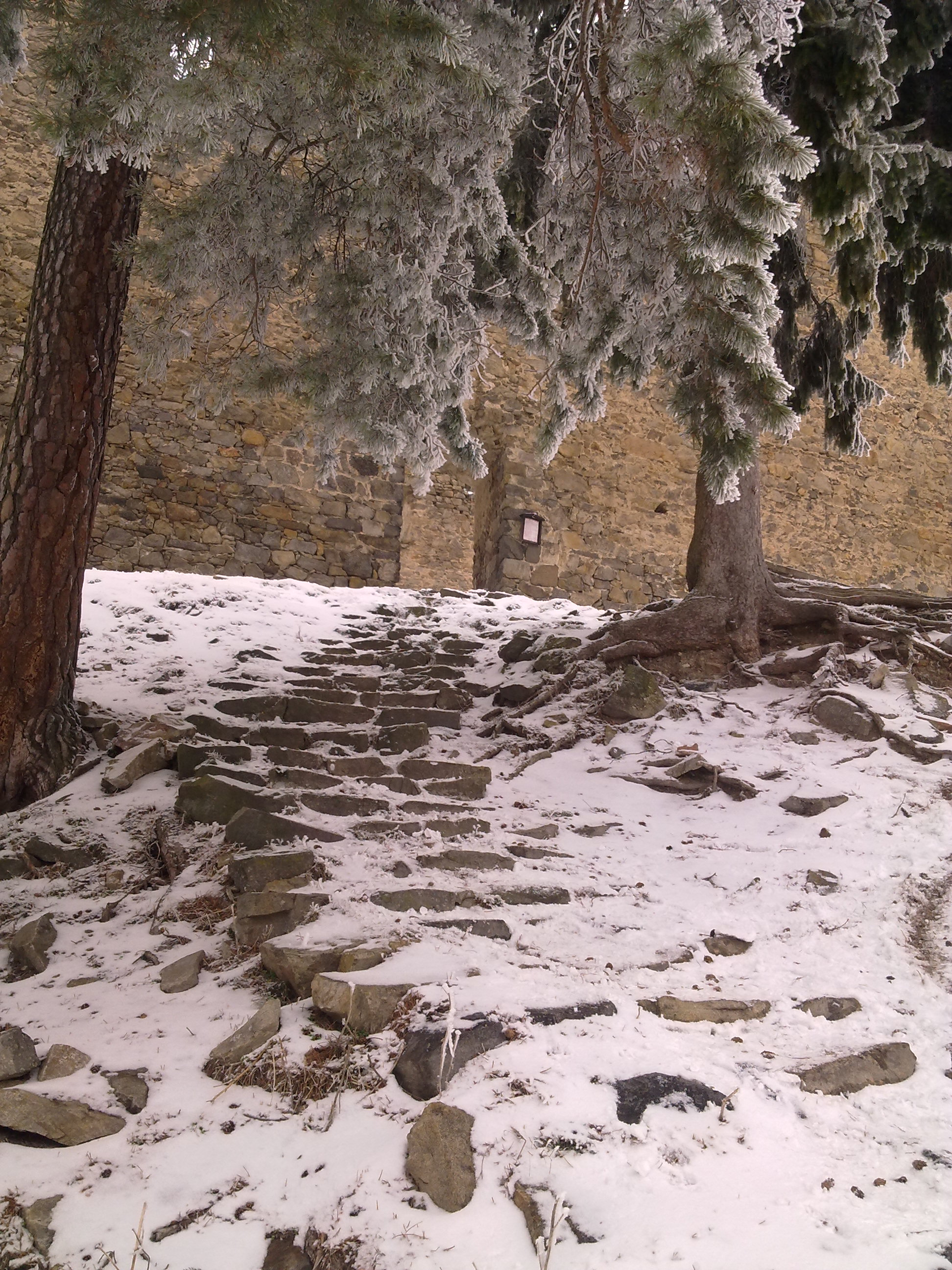
Entrance to the palace

Václav Vlček was originally just a regular captain, he had fought in Hungary and Poland, and in service of the King gained many military skills and became a field captain. He was known as an exceptional leader and specialist in defence. He strengthened the defence of the castle, and built three circular walls with placers for shooters between 1473 and 1483. He was very strong and unpopular with Rožemberk's neighbours, so he lent money to Count Jindřich Preuschenek of Hardegg to buy the castle, which he did in 1489. After his death, the castle returned to the hands of the Rožemberks.

In 1499 his son sold them the castle back. In 1523 there was a dispute over succession, because Petar IV. of Rožemberk, as well as his brothers, had no children. Between 1515 and 1518 the castle was in the hands of Želízko of Tourov, who fired all the staff and was all alone in the castle.

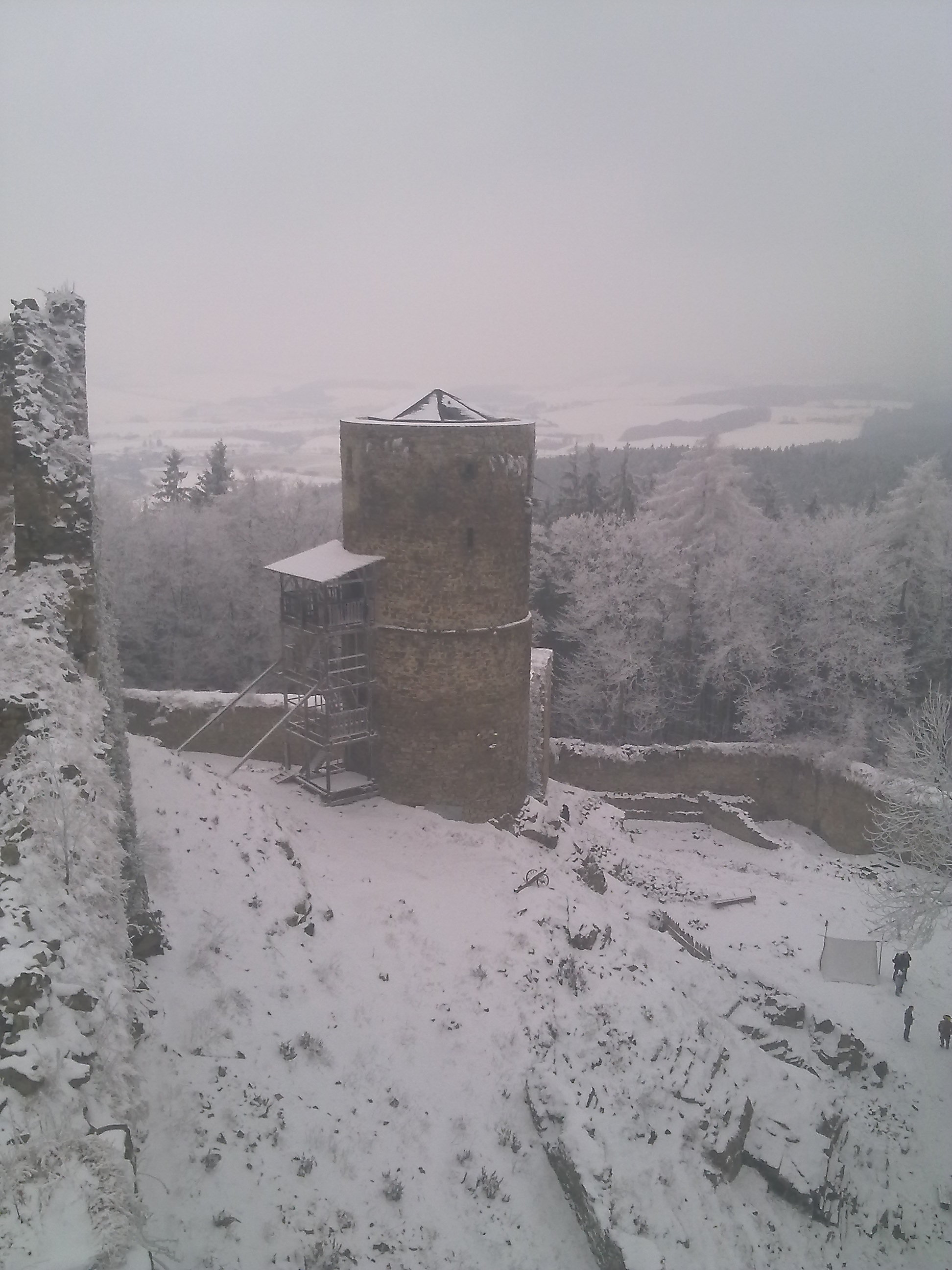
Helfenburk

In 1551 Vilém of Rožemberk annexed to the castle part of the surrounding properties and developed the castle itself. Helfenburk was one of the poorest castles, at least compared to the rest of the Rožemberk inventory. There was not much furniture and crockery, but that was compensated by equipment of the castle, such as tools and weapons. There were also not enough servants. After moving to Kratochvíle, Vilém left the castle completely abandoned.

In 1592 after the death of Vilém of Rožemberk his younger brother and successor, Petr Vok, sold the entire castle to the town of Bavorov. After the Battle of White Mountain the castle was confiscated, although the city tried and failed to get it back. The castle had already been recorded as abandoned, having been used for more than 200 years. Later it was owned by other families, such as Eggenberg, and later Schwarzenberg until the year 1922, when it became property of the state.

== Description ==
The castle is situated on top of a rock, which today is partially hidden by forests. In front of the castle there used to be a fortressed village. The castle has a circular floor plan. The entrance to the castle led through a bridge over a deep ditch and intermittent rocks, and is surrounded by walls. The entrance through the first door once led over the floating bridge.

Helfenburk has three gates, arranged one behind the other. To the left on the rock is a huge tower. It is 18m high, round and has a diameter of about 10 metres (33 ft). From it, it is possible to defend not only the main entrance, but also to see a large part of the castle and all three doors. The apartment of the tower guardian was also here. The tower can be entered through a wooden bridge from the building or by the stairs. At present it serves as a lookout tower following a reconstruction.

From the tower the circular walls, which were built by Vlček of Čenov, can be seen. Another door closes with a wedge. The whole bottom part of the second courtyard is enclosed by buildings and has an irregular shape. The third door leads to the inner palace. The front yard of the castle was full of commercial wooden structures. The structures made from bricks are the youngest in the castle and were made in the 15th century. The reservoir on the left side was used for rainwater or water that was brought from below the castle. The depth was around 10 metres (33 ft), but it was gradually buried.

The inside palace of the castle had ramparts, which are now the ruins in front of the castle, on which people walk. The palace had two basement floors; some theories suggest there was also a third. The palace consisted of two cores, essentially because there were two palaces that were gradually merged. In the corners of the palace there is some stonework, but the rest of the stone decoration was demolished in the 16th century for building materials. The north side of the castle, which cannot be seen from the large tower, was strengthened by the building of a smaller round tower. It is located where the three buildings connect, and is 15 metres (49 ft) high and now serves as a tourist attraction.

== Legends ==
In the 17th century, Helfenburk become a home for many lost and homeless people. A boy who looked like a monkey and survived by collecting fruits and roots was found there. After a long time he was successfully civilized.

According to some stories, hermits lived in Helfenburk.

According to another legend, treasure is hidden under the great tower, which can be found only on Good Friday. A farmer who lived near Koječin tried to find it. When he began to dig he saw a devil with a moustache, and he was frightened and ran, losing the treasure.

Another legend is about a piper who found a small black kitten. When he was home, the kitten was also at home. But immediately when he went to work, the kitten disappeared in an unknown direction. Once, in a bad mood, he was on his way back home. Close to Helfenburk stood a man dressed in black and asked him whether he wanted to make some money and play to his friends. The piper then follow him to the castle and played. But he was afraid to look at the people to whom he was playing, and who was actually paying. After a while he was encouraged and then he saw that he was playing to the cats. And the man who brought him to the castle was the black kitten. The piper was convinced that he had seen the devil himself.

== Present ==
The castle was abandoned until the 1930s, when the association of tourists started to take care of, repair and reopen the castle. Now the castle is owned by the town of Bavorov. In the 20th century the buildings were partially repaired. In 1977 the south defensive tower was remodelled to the lookout tower it is today, offering views of the surrounding area (the Písek hills with Velký Mehelník, Temelín, Vodňany, Novohrad hills, Blansko forest with the top Kleť, and hills of Šumava, Chlum, Libin, Bobik, Boubín Plechý in the background, and Brdy 50 km to the north). In spring and summer, the facility is used for various cultural programs.
