= World Puppetry Day =

Annual celebration of puppets

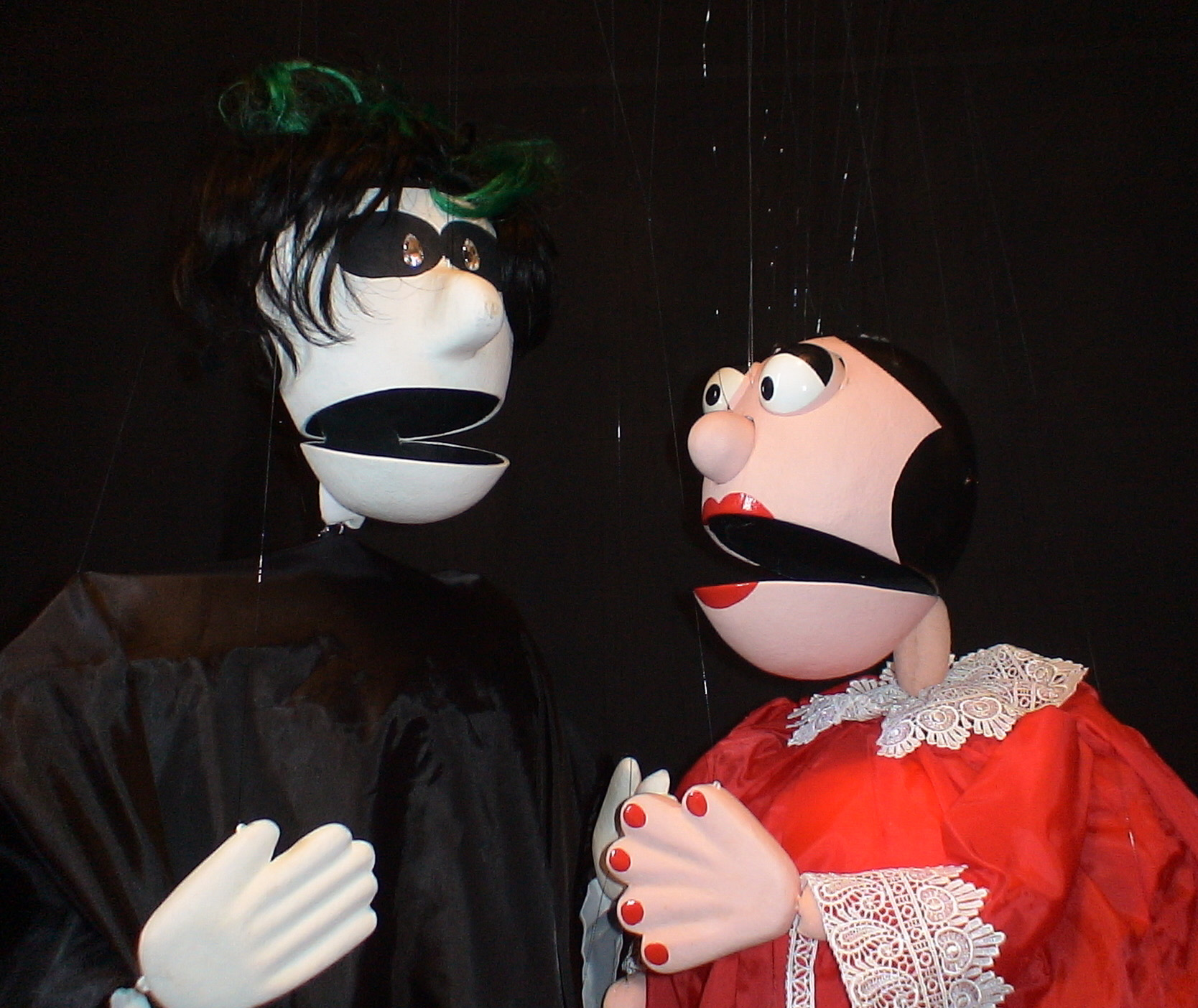
Marionettes-transformers.

World Puppetry Day is March 21. The idea came from the puppet theater artist Javad Zolfaghari from Iran. In 2000 at the XVIII Congress of the Union Internationale de la Marionnette, (UNIMA) in Magdeburg, he made the proposal for discussion. Two years later, at a meeting of the International Council of UNIMA in June 2002 in Atlanta, the date of the celebration was identified. The first celebration was in 2003.

Each year the day comes with a theme. In 2022, the theme was "The Sea" encouraging puppeteers to celebrate the day using some form of that theme.

World Puppetry Day is celebrated by puppet festivals, donating to puppet organizations, making puppets, or watching a puppet show. Some communities will put on puppet shows in honor of the day reminding people of this versatile and dying art form.

Puppets have been around for almost 4000 years in almost every civilization. Today puppets come in all shapes and sizes and are used to tell different stories.

== See also ==
- UNIMA
- Puppetry
- Puppeteer
- Kenya Institute of Puppet Theatre (KIPT)
