= Loutkář =

Czech theatre magazine

- Frequency: Every two months
- Founder: Jindřich Veselý
- First issue: 1912
- Country: Czech Republic
- Based in: Prague
- Language: Czech
- Website: loutkar.eu
- ISSN: 1211-4065

Loutkář ("The Puppeteer") is a Czech theatre magazine providing information about the Czech, Slovak and world puppet theatre.

== History and profile ==
Established in 1912, Loutkář is the oldest specialist puppet-theatre magazine in the world. The publishing was initiated by Jindřich Veselý, who became its first chief editor and edited the magazine until 1936.

The magazine was first published under the title of Český loutkář until 1914 when it ceased publication due to World War I. It was relaunched with its current name in 1917. However, its name was changed to Loutková scéna in 1951. The title was Československý loutkář between 1951 and 1992, and following the division of Czechoslovakia into the Czech Republic and Slovakia, it began to use its original name of Loutkář once again in 1993.
