= Kenya Institute of Puppet Theatre =

Kenya Institute of Puppet Theatre also known as KIPT is a Kenyan non-governmental and non-profit technical advisory and management community based theatre institute, which was founded in 2007.

KIPT uses puppetry, participatory educational theatre and folk media in life skills promotion, community education and cultural communication that, according to KIPT, engages people into interactive discourse.

== History ==
KIPT was founded by a team of puppet and theatre practitioners for the purpose of harnessing puppetry and folk media theatre experiences and using them for socioeconomic and environmental change. The organization seeks to contribute to the improvement of the livelihoods of the youth and the larger community through the promotion of greater personal and community involvement, accountability, awareness, growth and development, mainly in Kenya and Africa.

KIPT has hosted several festivals, which have taken place in Nairobi.

KIPT was initially called CHAPS (Community Health Awareness Puppeteers), which began in 1994 when a group of South African puppeteers, led by Gary Friedman, director of the African Research and Educational Development Program, were invited to Kenya by Dr Eric Krystall of FPPS in Nairobi to train local Kenyans to start their own program to combat HIV-AIDS in Kenya. A local program of "Puppets Against Aids" was set up in Nairobi and twenty years later, the group has expanded and strengthened their training, resources and outreach. Now, hundreds of puppeteers continue their outreach work through Eastern and Central Africa.

== Performances ==
- KIPT performed "the last man standing" in 2010. It is a story about a brave wildebeest called Mara, who goes through different stages of her life and then ends up as carcass. The story takes place in 2070 and is told by using bones. It was performed the first time on 9 April 2010 in Kenya at the Italien Institute of Culture. "The last man standing" have been performed in Nairobi, Mombasa, South Africa and Indonesia.
- KIPT (back then as CHAPS) performed "Puppets against Corruption", which is a performance about the corruption in Kenya that portrays the corruption using the world of animals. The performance was a part of the "Puppets against Corruption" project, which involved a series of anti-corruption performances and gave information about corruption's consequences.

== Consultancies ==
The organization has undertaken consultancies in the designing of learning materials, facilitation of workshops, training in puppetry and folk media for national and international organizations. These include; Netherlands Leprosy Relief, Aktion Africa Hilfe, UNICEF, Merlin International, German Development Cooperation (GIZ), Lutheran World Federation, SNV, PLAN International, UNHCR, World Vision, International Federation of Red Cross and Red Crescent Societies, British Council, Warner and Consorten, DSW, Action Aid Kenya, Family Health International, Family Care International and the Association of AIDS Organisation (TASO) in Uganda, among others.

It has initiated puppetry projects in Nigeria, Eritrea, Sudan, Somalia, Uganda and Liberia and participated in collaborative puppetry projects in Belgium, the Netherlands, Austria, South Africa, Finland, Denmark and Australia.

== See also ==
- World Puppetry Day
- UNIMA
