= UNIMA =

Professional association for puppeteers

Coordinates: 49°46′20.79″N 4°43′18.08″E

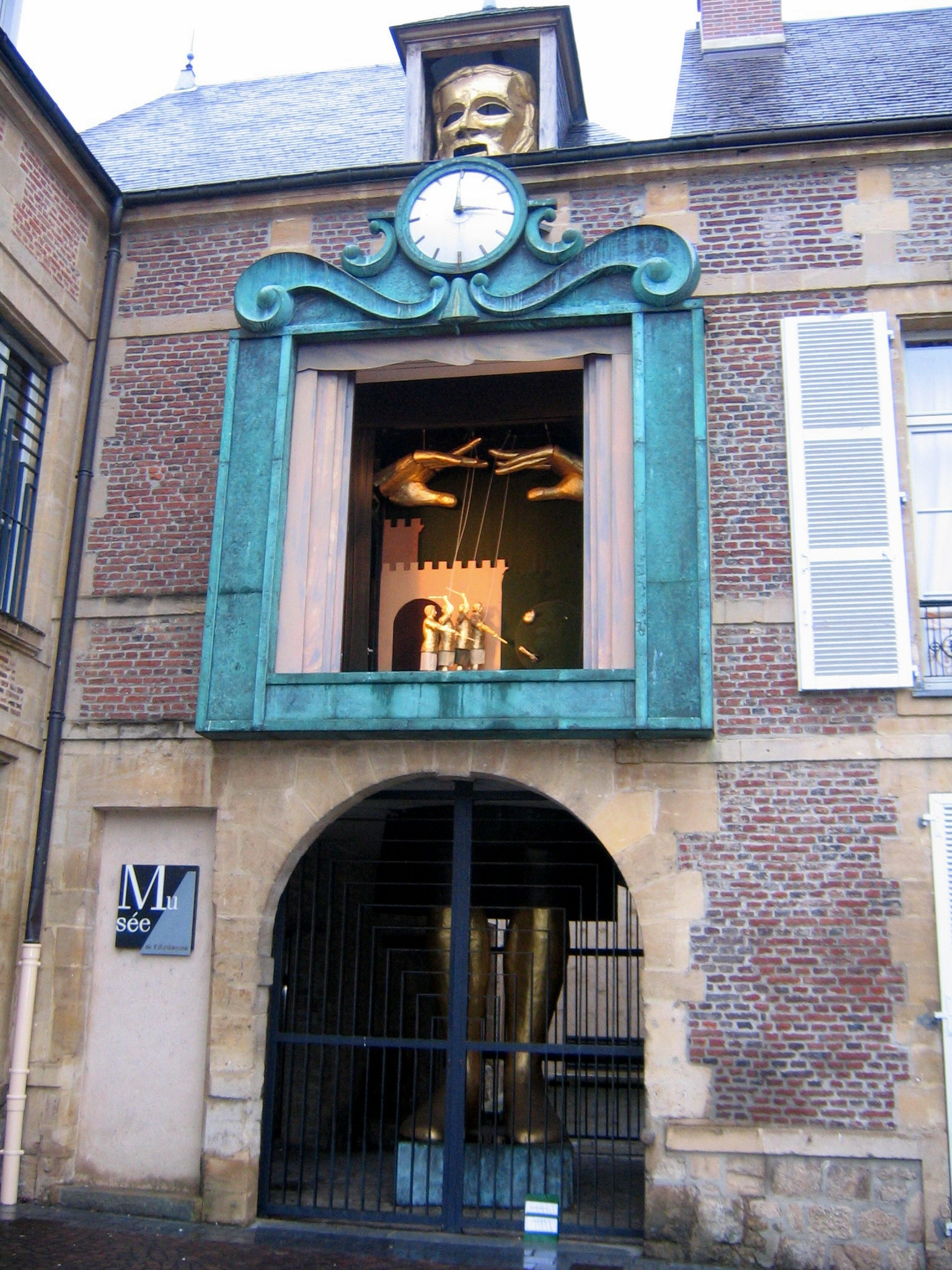
The seat of UNIMA in Charleville-Mézières, France

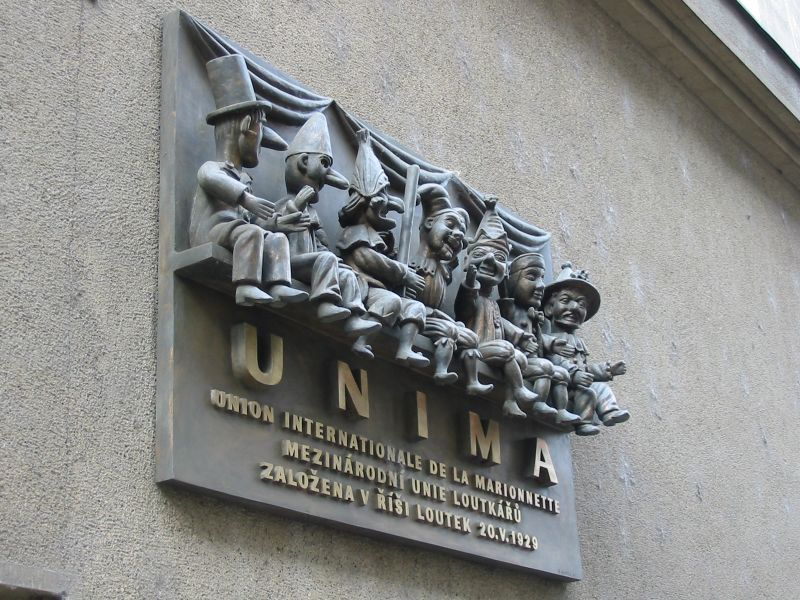
Memorial tablet commemorating the founding of UNIMA in Prague, Czech Republic

UNIMA (Union Internationale de la Marionnette – International Puppetry Association) is an international non-governmental organization that brings together puppeteers and puppet enthusiasts to develop and promote the art of puppetry. It was founded in Prague in 1929 (the then Czechoslovak magazine Loutkář was UNIMA's first official journal in years 1929–1930). In 1981, the French puppeteer Jacques Félix moved UNIMA's headquarters to Charleville-Mézières, France, location of the Festival Mondial des Théâtres de Marionnettes since 1972. UNIMA is affiliated to UNESCO and it is a member of the International Theatre Institute. UNIMA is affiliated with the International Theatre Institute and is present in 87 countries. Its headquarters is located in Charleville-Mézières.

== History ==
UNIMA was founded on May 20, 1929, in Prague, during the 5th Congress of Czech Puppeteers, upon the proposal of French writer Paul Jeanne. The Czech magazine Loutkář served as its official journal from 1929 to 1930. The last UNIMA congress before World War II took place in 1933 in Ljubljana.

After the war, UNIMA was revived in 1957 by the Czechoslovaks during the European Puppet Week in Braunschweig (then in West Germany). Jan Malík, who had been its Secretary-General before the war, led discussions to revive the association. A congress was held the same year in Prague, with 17 countries represented (from the United States to North Korea, in the context of the Cold War), establishing statutes that ensured equal representation of countries from the West and the East in the presidium.

In the 1970s, the association modernized: the presidium became the executive committee, and UNIMA moved its headquarters from Prague to Warsaw, where it remained for eight years. The headquarters was then established in Charleville-Mézières, known for its World Festival of Puppet Theatre, and where the International Puppet Institute and the École nationale supérieure des arts de la marionnette later settled.

== National centers ==
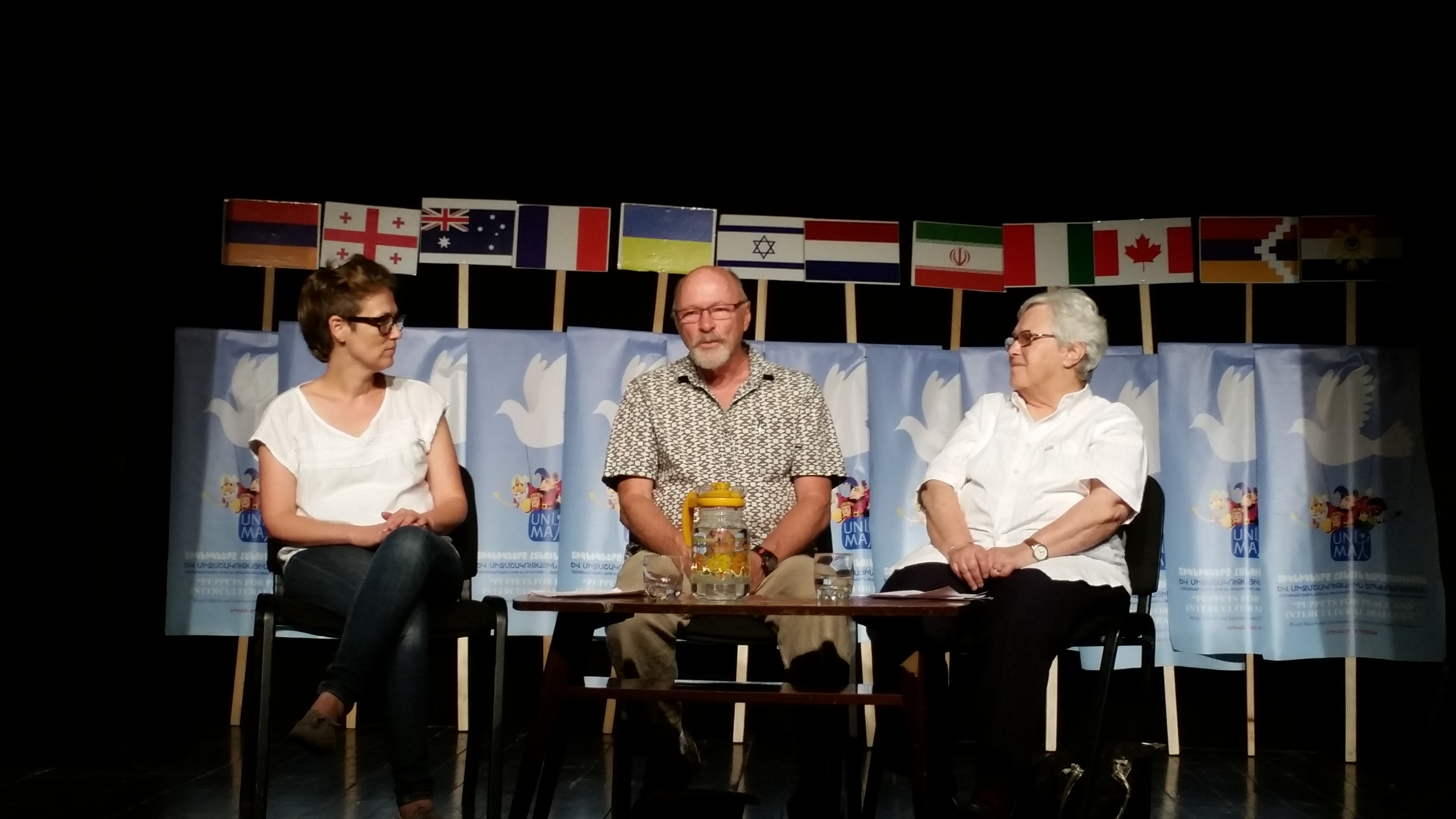
UNIMA Festival, Armenia 2015 (Right to Left): Martine Levy (UNESCO); Jacques Trudeau (Secretary General of UNIMA); Dikla Katz (The Key Theatre, UNIMA Representative in Israel)

There are National centers throughout the world, which include:

- UNIMA-USA founded by Jim Henson in 1966. In 1992 the Center for Puppetry Arts in Atlanta became the headquarters for UNIMA-USA
- UNIMA Australia
- UNIMA Pakistan
- British UNIMA
- UNIMA France - THEMAA
- UNIMA Spain
- Mobarak UNIMA (UNIMA Iran)

== UNIMA World Congresses ==
World congresses have been held in:

- 1929: Prague (Presidency: Jindřich Veselý)
- 1929: Paris
- 1930: Liège
- 1933: Ljubljana (New presidency: Josef Skupa) (New General Secretary: Jan Malík)
- 1957: Prague (New presidency: Max Jacob)
- 1958: Bucharest
- 1960: Bochum-Braunschweig
- 1962: Warsaw
- 1966: Munich
- 1969: Prague (New presidency: Jan Bussell)
- 1972: Charleville-Mézières (New General Secretary: Henryk Jurkowski)
- 1976: Moscow (New presidency: Sergej Obrazcov)
- 1980: Washington, D.C. (New General Secretary: Jacques Felix)
- 1984: Dresden (New presidency: Henryk Jurkowski)
- 1988: Nagoya
- 1992: Ljubljana (New presidency: Sirppa Sivori-Asp)
- 1996: Budapest
- 2000: Magdeburg (New presidency: Margareta Niculescu)
- 2004: Rijeka (New presidency: Massimo Schuster) (New General Secretary: Miguel Arreche)
- 2008: Perth (New presidency: Dadi Pudumjee) (New General Secretary: Jacques Trudeau)
- 2012: Chengdu
- 2016: Tolosa
- 2020: Bali : Holds non-face-to-face online a year later because of COVID-19
- 2025: Chuncheon

== See also ==
- World Puppetry Day
- Kenya Institute of Puppet Theatre (KIPT)
