= Marionette =

Puppet controlled from above using wires or strings

A marionette in use in Japan, 2018

A marionette (/ˌmæriəˈnɛt/ MARR-ee-ə-NET; French: marionnette [maʁjɔnɛt]), or string puppet, is a puppet controlled from above using wires or strings and a controller depending on regional variations. A marionette's puppeteer is called a marionettist. Marionettes are operated with the puppeteer hidden or revealed to an audience by using a vertical or horizontal control bar in different forms of theatres or entertainment venues. They have also been used in films and on television. The attachment of the strings varies according to its character or purpose.

== Etymology ==
In French, marionnette means 'little Mary'. During the Middle Ages, string puppets were often used in France to depict biblical events, with the Virgin Mary being a popular character, hence the name.

In France, the word marionnette can refer to any kind of puppet, but elsewhere it typically refers only to string puppets.

== History ==
=== Antiquity ===
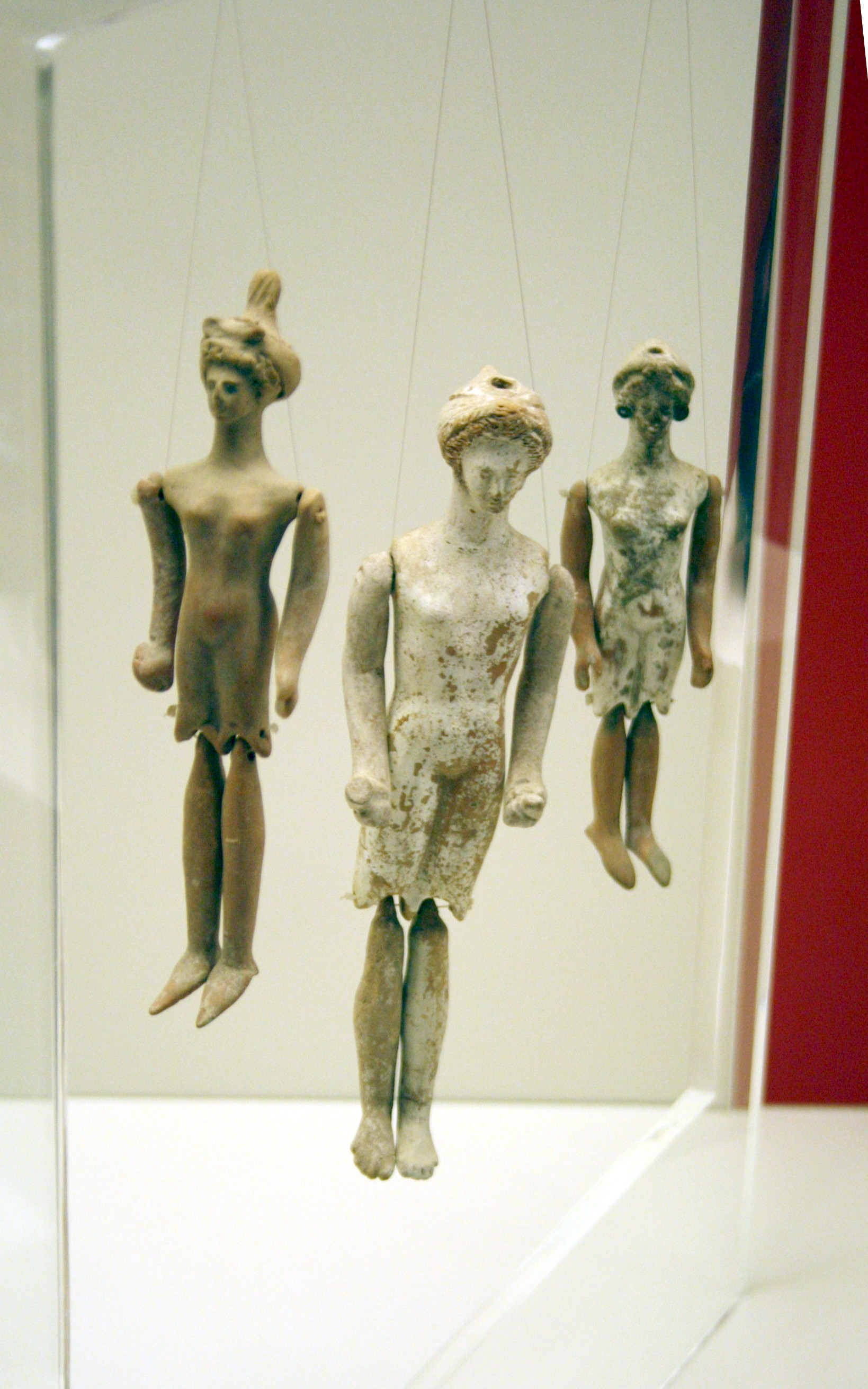
Ancient Greek terracotta puppet dolls, 5th–4th century BC, National Archaeological Museum, Athens

Puppetry is an ancient form of performance. Some historians claim that they predate actors in theatre. There is evidence that string-controlled objects, including string-operated figures of wood manipulated to act as if kneading bread, were used in Egypt as early as 2000 BC. Wire-controlled, articulated puppets made of clay and ivory have been found in Egyptian tombs. Marionette puppetry was used in rituals and ceremonies in ancient times and is still used today.

Puppetry was practiced in Ancient Greece and the oldest written records of puppetry can be found in the works of Herodotus and Xenophon, dating from the 5th century BC. The Greek word translated as puppet is νευρόσπαστος (nevróspastos), which literally means 'drawn by strings, string-pulling', from νεῦρον (nevron), meaning either 'sinew, tendon, muscle, string', or 'wire', and σπάω (spáō), meaning 'draw, pull'.

Aristotle (384–322 BC) discusses puppets in his work On the Motion of Animals:

The movements of animals may be compared with those of automatic puppets, which are set going on the occasion of a tiny movement; the levers are released and strike the twisted strings against one another.

Archimedes is known to have worked with marionettes. Plato's work also contains references to puppetry. The Iliad and the Odyssey were presented using puppetry. The roots of European puppetry probably extend back to the Greek plays with puppets played to the "common people" in the 5th century BC. By the 3rd century BC, these plays would appear in the Theatre of Dionysus at the Acropolis.

In ancient Greece and Rome, clay and ivory dolls, dated from around 500 BC, were found in children's tombs. These dolls had articulated arms and legs, some of which had an iron rod extending up from the tops of their heads. This rod was used to manipulate the doll from above, as is done today in Sicilian puppetry. A few of these dolls had strings in place of the rods. Some researchers believe these ancient figures were mere toys and not puppets due to their small size.

The Indian word sutradhara, from sutra, refers to the show-manager of theatrical performances (or a puppet-player), and also means literally 'string-puller' or 'string-holder'.

=== Sicily ===
The sides of donkey carts are decorated with intricate, painted scenes from the Frankish romantic poems, such as The Song of Roland. These same tales are enacted in traditional puppet theatres featuring hand-made marionettes of wood, an art form called l'opera deî pupi 'opera of the puppets' in Sicilian. The opera of the puppets and the Sicilian tradition of cantastorî (singers of tales) are rooted in the Provençal troubadour tradition in Sicily during the reign of Frederick II, Holy Roman Emperor, in the first half of the 13th century.

=== Opera ===
In the 18th century, operas were specifically composed for marionettes. Gluck, Haydn, de Falla and Respighi all composed adult operas for marionettes. Lewis Carroll composed marionette operas and plays for his siblings' entertainment. Today in Salzburg in Austria, the Salzburg Marionette Theatre continues the tradition of presenting full-length opera using marionettes in their own theatre.

The Opera di Pupi, Sicilian puppet theatre, was relisted on the Representative List of the Intangible Cultural Heritage of Humanity in 2008.

=== Modern theatre ===
Marionettes are sometimes referred to as puppets, but the term marionettes is more precise, distinguishing them from other forms of puppetry, such as finger, glove, rod, and shadow puppetry.

In the UK the renaissance of Marionettes during the late 19th and early 20th century was driven by Harry Whanslaw and Waldo Lanchester, two of the co-founders of the British Puppet and Model Theatre Guild. In 1936 Lanchester and his wife Muriel opened the Lanchester Marionette Theatre in Malvern, Worcestershire, “the only theatre in the country exclusively to be used for marionettes” at the time. The only purpose-built UK marionette theatre is The Harlequin Puppet Theatre (built 1958) in Rhos on Sea, North Wales, Founded by Eric Bramall FRSA and continued by Chris Somerville. Other theatres that occasionally perform with marionettes are the Little Angel Theatre founded by John and Lyndie Wright in Islington, London, whose first-ever show The Wild Night Of The Witches was a marionette play. It opened the theatre in 1961 and was revived for the 50th anniversary in 2011. The Norwich Puppet Theatre founded by Ray & Joan DaSilva sometimes presents marionette shows and the Puppet Theatre Barge, founded by Gren Middleton and Juliet Rogers, continues to perform using long string marionettes throughout the year. The barge is based in Little Venice, London during the winter months and tours to places such as Richmond Upon Thames during the summer.

In Scotland, Dr Malcolm Knight has championed the art form and over the last 25 years, the Scottish Mask and Puppet Centre has acted as a catalyst, a lead agency, and as a resource centre for all those with an interest in mask and puppet theatre.

In Germany, the Augsburger Puppenkiste since 1948 has produced theatrical adaptations of fairy tales and serious pieces. In 1953, it began producing television series with productions such as Jim Knopf und Lukas der Lokomotivführer and Urmel aus dem Eis.

In Austria, the Salzburg Marionette Theatre was founded in 1913 by Professor Anton Aicher. Aicher was heavily influenced by Count Franz Pocci who founded the Munich Marionette Theatre in Germany in 1855. Until 2012, the Salzburg Marionette Theatre was under the artistic direction of his granddaughter, Gretl Aicher, who commented on her lasting interest in marionettes, "What then is the fascination of a life with marionettes? Is it the pleasure of performing? The appeal of mastering an 'instrument' to the point of virtuosity? The transformation of one's own self? For me, it is the process of empathizing with mind and soul, of feeling at one with music and movement that bring these much-loved creatures to life." The Salzburg Marionette Theatre performs mainly operas such as Die Fledermaus and The Magic Flute and a small number of ballets such as The Nutcracker. The Salzburg Marionette Theatre productions are aimed at adults although children are welcome. There is also a marionette theatre at Schoenbrunn Palace in Vienna.

In the Czech Republic marionette theatre has a very long history in entertainment in Prague. An important organisation is the National Marionette Theatre. Its repertoire mainly features a marionette production of Mozart's famous Don Giovanni. The production has period costumes and a beautifully designed 18th-century setting. There are numerous other companies including, Buchty a Loutky (Cakes and Puppets) founded by Marek Bečka. Rocky IX and Tibet are just two works in the repertoire.

In Australia, like in many other countries, there is a continuing tradition of marionette puppetry. Norman Hetherington OAM, Peter Scriven (founder of the Marionette Theatre of Australia) Richard Bradshaw OAM and David Splatt (Smallpox Theatre), David Hamilton and Murray Raine are notable puppeteers. The late Phillip Edmiston performed with his Queensland Marionette Theatre a range of productions including the spectacular The Grand Adventure.

In Picardy, Lafleur is a marionette from Amiens. The Cabotans d'Amiens are hand-carved, using wood, with a central rod and strings for the arms and legs. In France, the most famous puppet is the Guignol which is a hand puppet created in Lyon in 1808.

In the United States, several groups have established permanent theatres or touring programs dedicated to spotlighting marionette performances. The Cole Marionettes were founded by George and Lucille Cole in Chicago circa 1934. The Bob Baker Marionette Theater in Los Angeles is now considered a historical landmark, presented a variety of cabaret marionette shows. The Puppetworks theatre in New York under the direction of Nick Coppola has been in operation since 1980. The Center for Puppetry Arts in Atlanta develops and fosters marionette performers from across the globe. Le Theatre de Marionette in Dallas has recreated a traditional marionette theatre with puppeteer bridge and full stage productions. The theatre is open year-round. The National Marionette Theater with David Syrotiak at its helm has developed some of the most artistically staged shows to grace the American stage. The Fratello Marionettes of Danville, California stage shows that are well crafted and display an almost Disney-esque quality. The Bil Baird theatre in Greenwich Village closed in 1987 but was a nationally recognized treasure that presented countless shows to families for over a decade, including their contribution to film and television with the famous Lonely Goatherd scene from The Sound of Music. The Frisch Marionettes in Cincinnati were founded by Kevin Frisch, who has been considered one of the best stage marionette artists of his time. His manipulation and ability to transfer lifelike movement to the inanimate has been compared to the German master puppeteer, Albrecht Roser. Joseph Cashore has been touring the United States for over 30 years with a collection of self-designed marionettes.

=== Television and film ===
The 1952 Andy Pandy title card. The card was not actually a card as the blocks turned to reveal the title one block at a time.

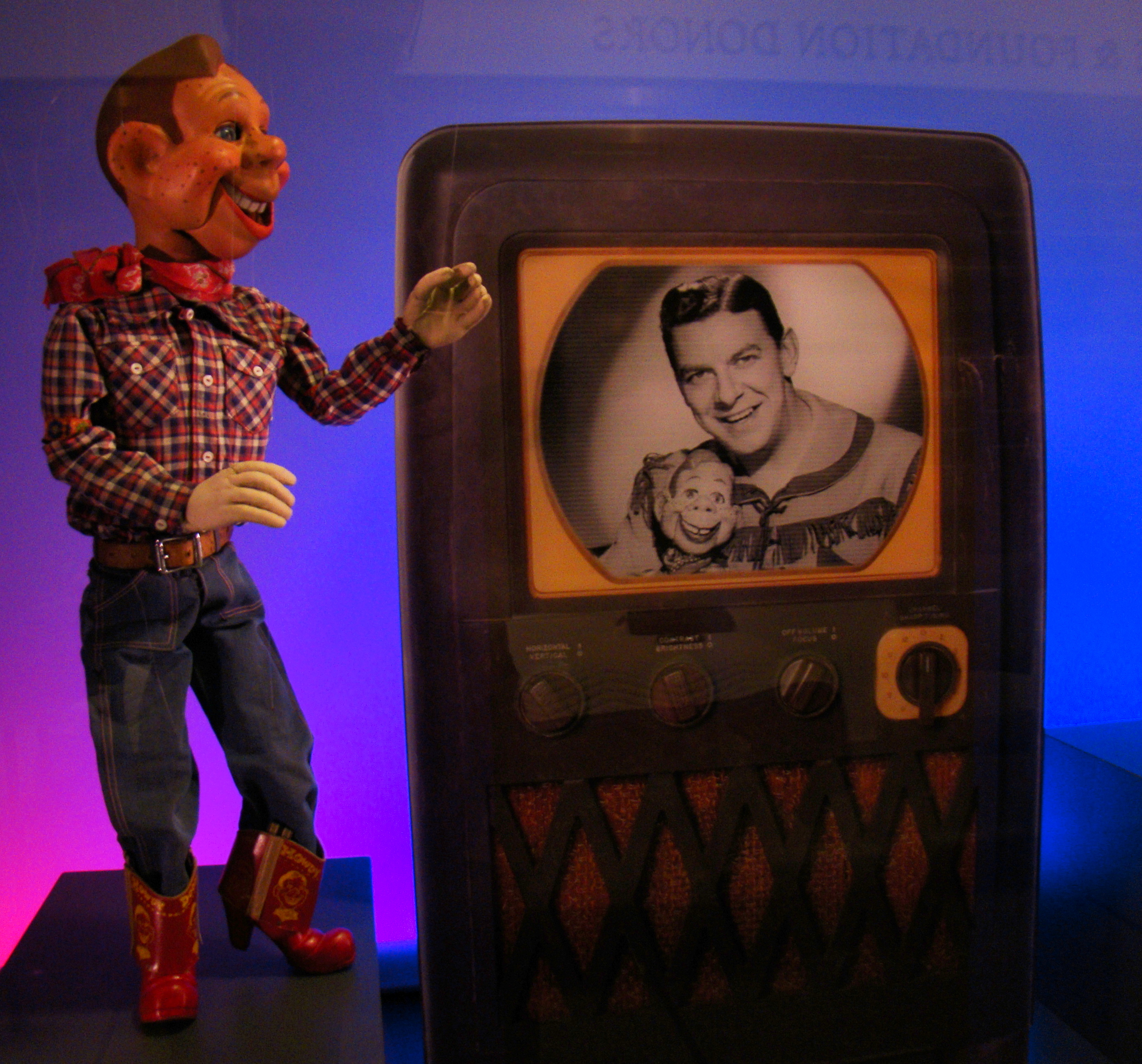
Howdy Doody, famous US television marionette.

With the rise in popularity of television and film, marionettes found a rise in popularity, especially in children's programming. In 1947, Howdy Doody introduced marionettes to children's television, with Howdy Doody (the main character) being a marionette, as well as some other characters.

In the 1950s, Bil Baird and Cora Eisenberg presented a great number of marionette shows for television, and were also responsible for the Lonely Goatherd sequence from the classic film The Sound of Music. Bil Baird also wrote a classic book on his work. In Australia, a program called Mr. Squiggle, using a marionette central character of the same name, ran for just over 40 years (1959–1999). Another program for children using puppetry was the Magic Circle Club featuring puppets Cassius Cuckoo and Leonardo de Funbird.

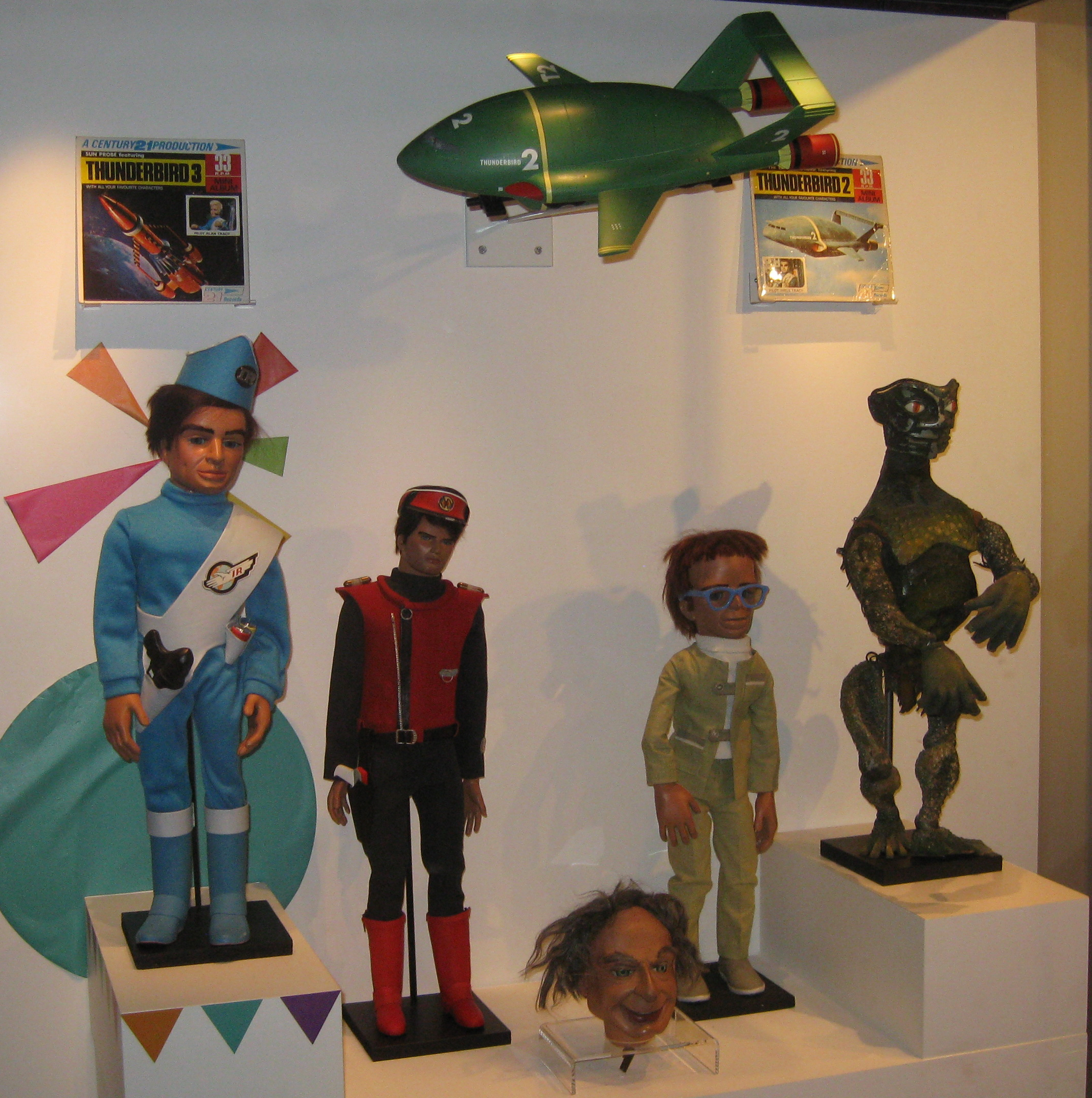
A display of marionettes used in Supermarionation television series such as Thunderbirds and Captain Scarlet and the Mysterons at the National Media Museum in Bradford, United Kingdom

From the 1940s onward, the BBC in the United Kingdom, produced a wide series of marionette programmes for children and then created The BBC Television Puppet Theatre based in Lime Grove Studios from 1955 to 1964. They were usually shown under the title Watch With Mother The various programmes included Whirligig, The Woodentops, Flower Pot Men, Muffin The Mule, Rubovia, a series created by Gordon Murray, and Andy Pandy. Later in the 1960s, Gerry Anderson with his wife, Sylvia Anderson and colleagues made a number of hit series, Fireball XL5, Stingray and Thunderbirds, which pioneered a technique combining marionettes and electronics. This allowed for radio control moving of the mouth of a marionettes. The technique was patented and called "supermarionation". The programs have been shown all around the world and are now widely distributed on DVD. Anderson also made two films, Thunderbirds Are Go and Thunderbird 6. During the 1970s in the UK TV series using marionettes include The Adventures of Rupert Bear, Mumfie and Cloppa Castle. Some marionettes appear in Pipkins namely Octavia Ostrich. More recently marionettes are starting to re-emerge on the TV screen, Coca-Cola have used marionettes to create a series of adverts based in an office and music videos use them regularly as metaphors.

Marionettes are featured in the 1999 film, Being John Malkovich. John Cusack played a manipulator who referred to himself as a puppeteer.

The BBC children's show Playbus (later Playdays) used many puppets during their commission, notably a singing and dancing marionette called Lizzie Dreams, sometimes paired up with another marionette called Nick.

Team America: World Police is a 2004 movie made by South Park creators Matt Stone and Trey Parker which uses a crude, naive, childlike style of Supermarionation as in Thunderbirds. Matt Stone and Trey Parker dubbed their version "Supercrappymation" due to the fact they intentionally left the strings visible, among other reasons.

Also appearing in 2004 was the full-length, award-winning marionette fantasy film Strings, directed by Anders Rønnow Klarlund.

A marionette was also used in the Doctor Who episode "The Shakespeare Code".

== Control bar types ==
=== Asian paddle ===
This type of control has many strings attached to a rounded rectangular paddle with a short handle, all the strings are attached and hang from the outer edge of the paddle and are used by selecting each string with the opposite hand and pulling to control the figure which hangs below.

=== Horizontal ===
This control is a bar that is held in the hand in a horizontal plane. There can be numerous bars at right angles to the central bar, which in turn attach via wires to the hands, shoulders, back, etc. A smaller plate is usually hung under the main bar, and this carries the head strings; likewise, a detachable clip usually holds the leg bar. This style of control is generally used in the US for human figures and is also known as the American control. A similar control is almost universally used for quadruped animals; as it emulates the basic shape of the animal, rocking it from side to side will control the leg movements in unison. The Salzburg Marionette Theatre in Austria also uses a variant of this style for its human characters.

=== Vertical ===
This type of control is an upright bar that has various smaller bars inserted at right angles from which the head, shoulder, back etc. strings etc. are attached to. This control usually has a detachable leg bar that controls walking when held in the opposite hand. The arms are controlled by wires which are inserted into a hole in the shaft bent at approximately 45 degrees to the shaft and hang loosely with a loop at the end to attach the hand strings, these are then moved by the fingers holding the main shaft. A tilt of the main upright controls the head and body with a fine nuance, This type of control is usually called the British control. Another variation of the vertical control is found in Europe usually a rigid wire rod extends from the centre of the head upward and is fixed rigidly to the control, The leg bar is inserted through the main upright but pivots on a pin to allow movement of the legs.

== Styles ==
=== British ===
British marionettes are similar to German marionettes. The usual human form has nine strings — one string to each knee, hand and shoulder, two strings to the head and one string to the lower back. The control is usually the British upright control with separate leg bar. Optional stringing includes elbows, forehead or nose.

Pelham Puppets are a commercially made British puppet who usually have seven strings that are attached to the legs, hands, head and back. The controls are usually a horizontal folding cross bar. Bob Pelham developed the British marionettes in 1947.

=== Burmese ===
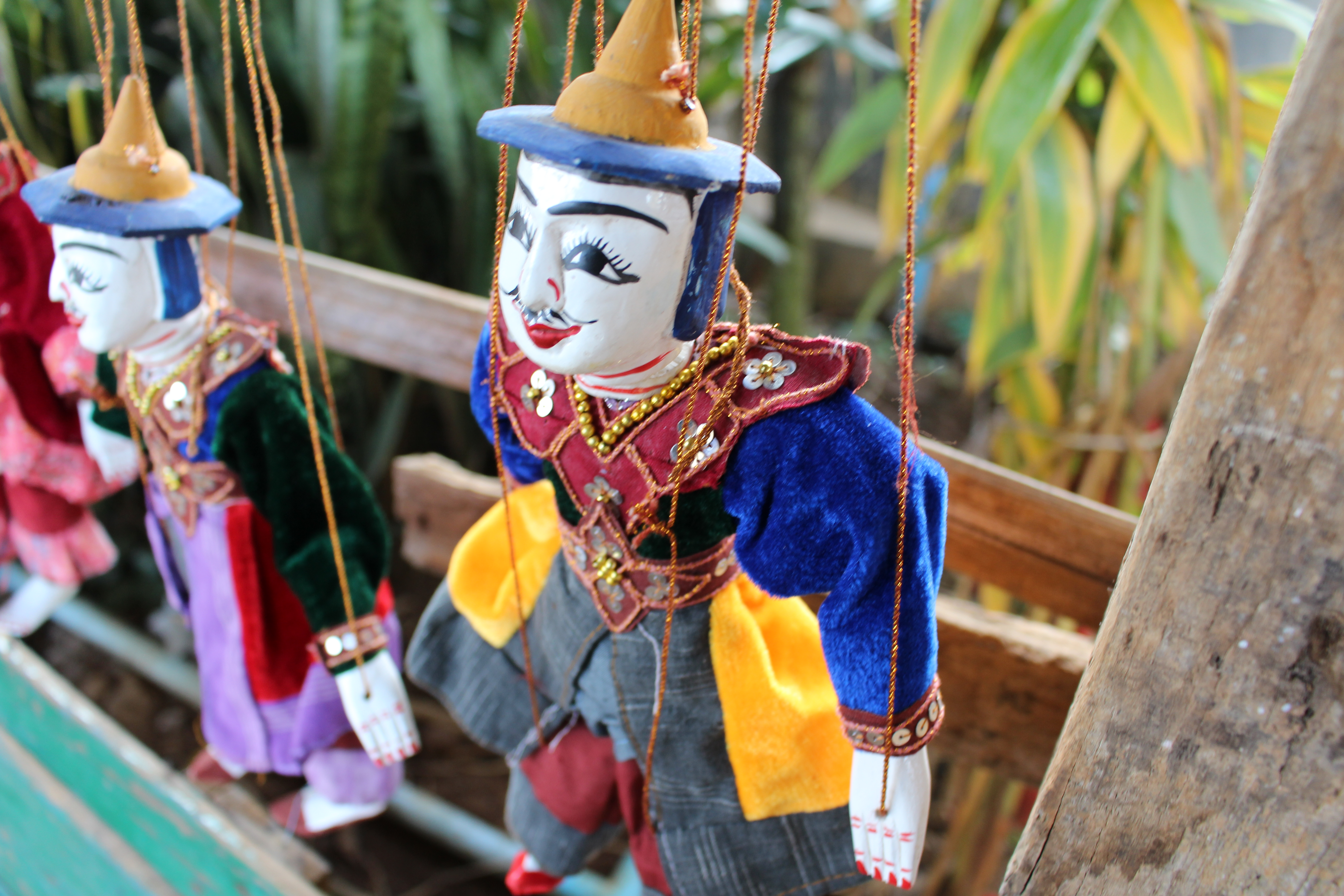
Traditional Burmese commander-in-chief marionette

Burmese marionettes are all string operated and are a popular art in Burma. Marionettes are called Yoke thé (lit. miniatures) and are almost always performed in operas. A Burmese marionette troupe must have 27 characters, including a king, animals such as horse, elephant, tiger, monkey and parrot, ministers, prince and princess and buffoons A hsaing waing, a traditional Burmese orchestra usually provides the music. Burmese marionettes are very intricate and dexterous as they employ 18 (for male characters) or 19 (for female) wires, each puppet controlled only by one puppeteer.

=== Czech ===
Czech rod marionettes are similar to Sicilian ones though they are more complex. They are hand-carved, usually using lime wood. The marionettes have the central rod-like the Sicilian marionette but also have strings for the arms and legs. Sometimes they also use string to control a mouth or movable ears. These require more skilled manipulation. Czechs also have marionettes that have no central rod and strings that are attached to the head, shoulders, and back. These are the most difficult marionettes to manipulate due to the absence of the central rod. Miroslav Trejtnar is an acknowledged master puppeteer and teacher of traditional Czech marionette-making skills.

A BBC article explains how this craft saved Czech culture and language from being eradicated in favor of German.

=== German ===
They have eight strings that are attached to the legs, hands, head, shoulders, and back. The controls are horizontal.

=== Sicilian ===
Sicilian marionettes are among the simplest marionettes to operate. They are usually carved out of wood and have a sturdy rod that extends up through the body into the head. This rod, and one string attached to the hand, controls the manipulation of the puppet.

== Gallery ==
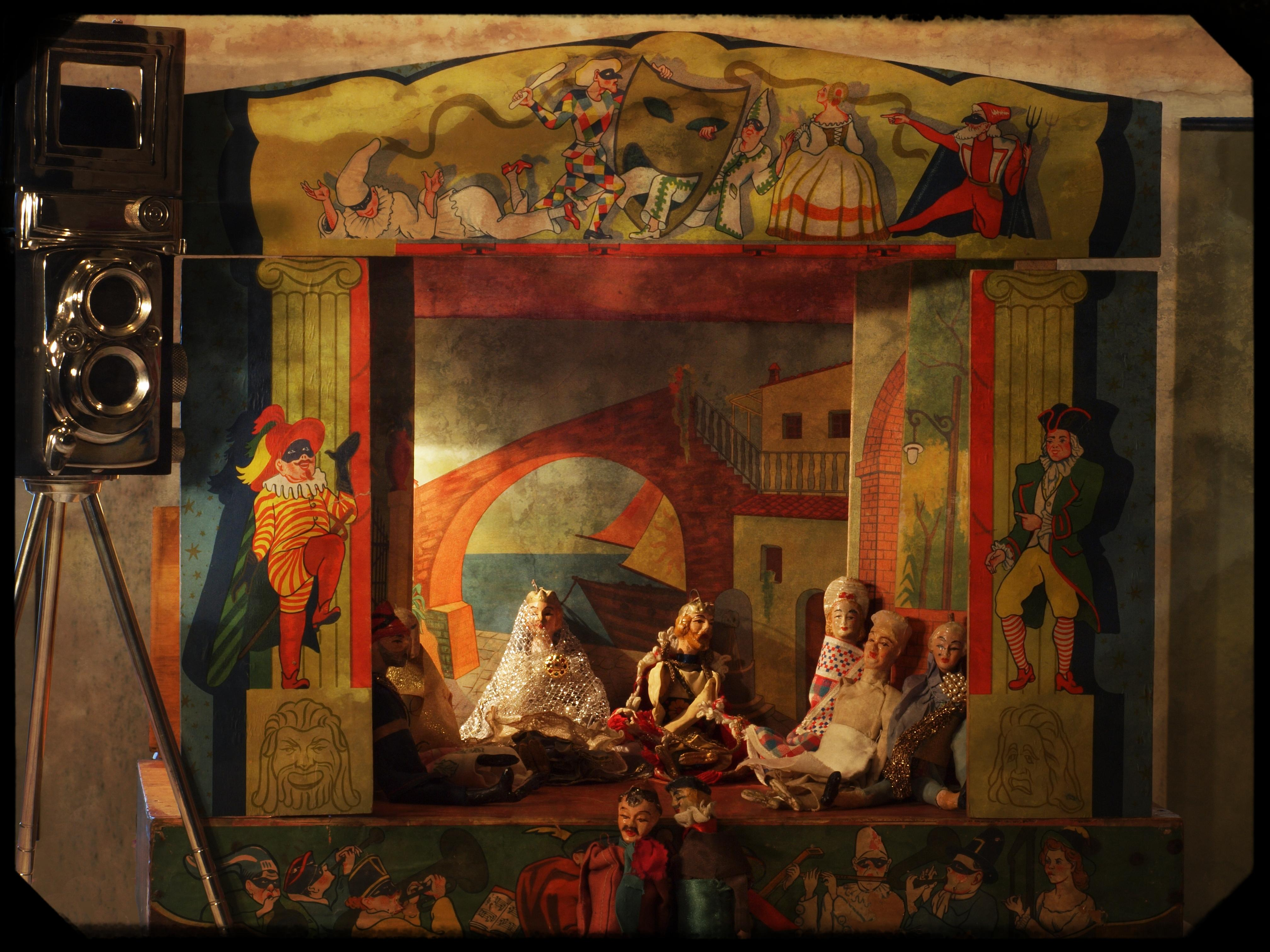
A little theatre of marionettes, Italy, 1959

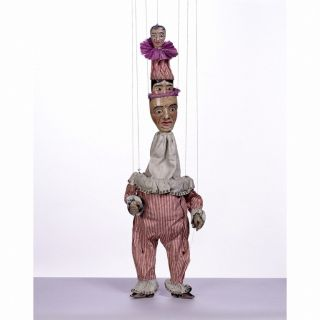
Marionette from Tiller family marionette company, 1870s-1890s

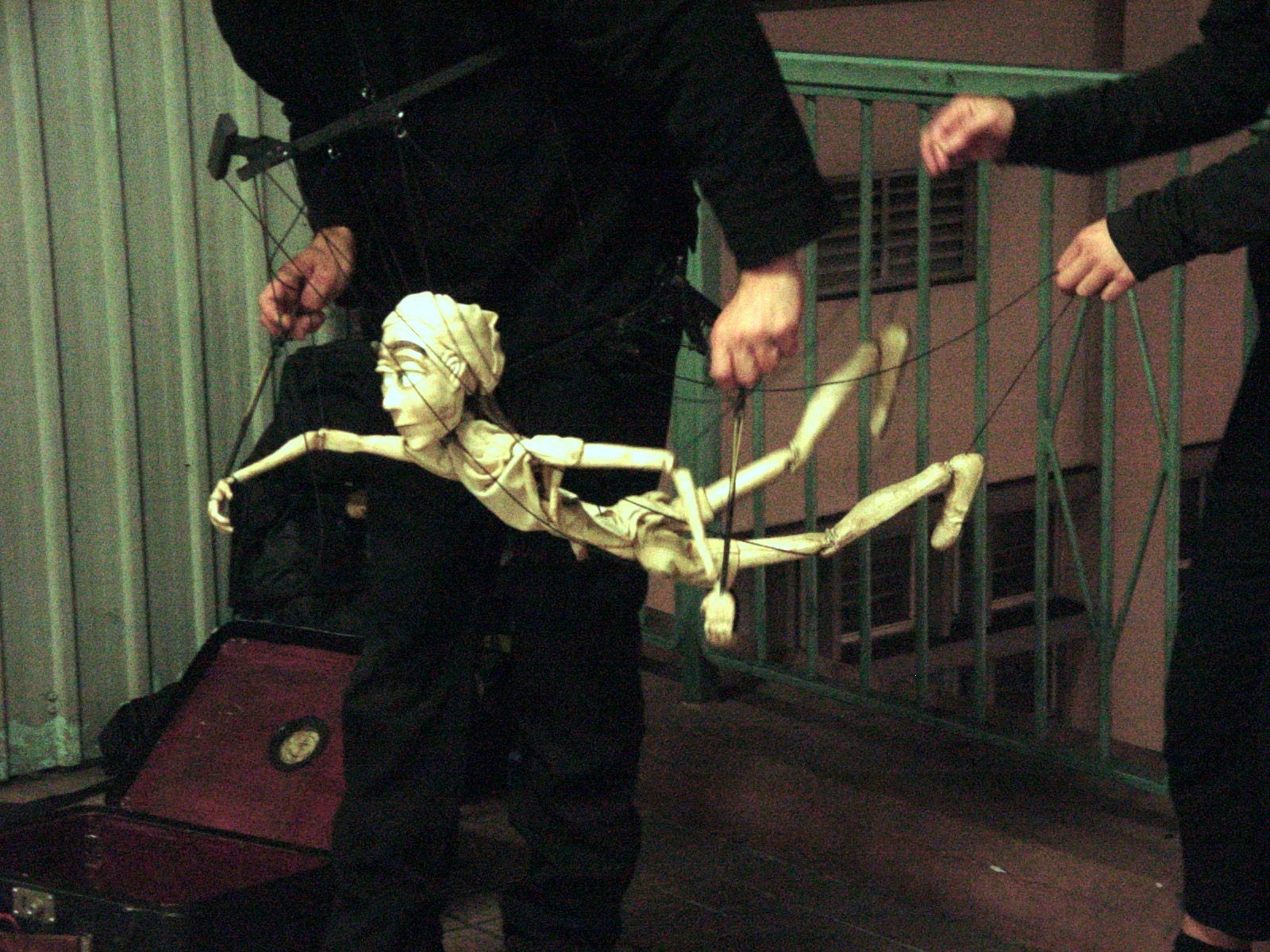
A marionette

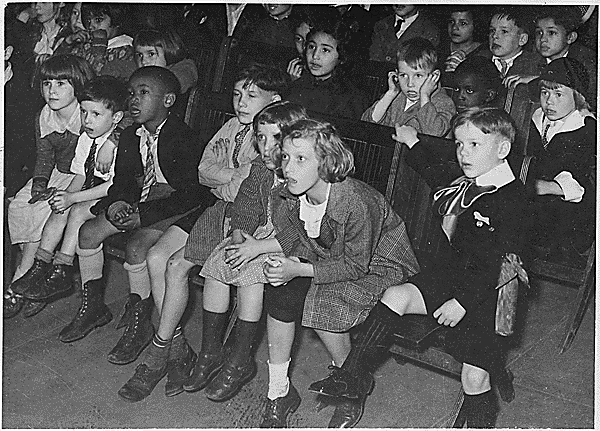
Children watching marionettes in New York, 1935

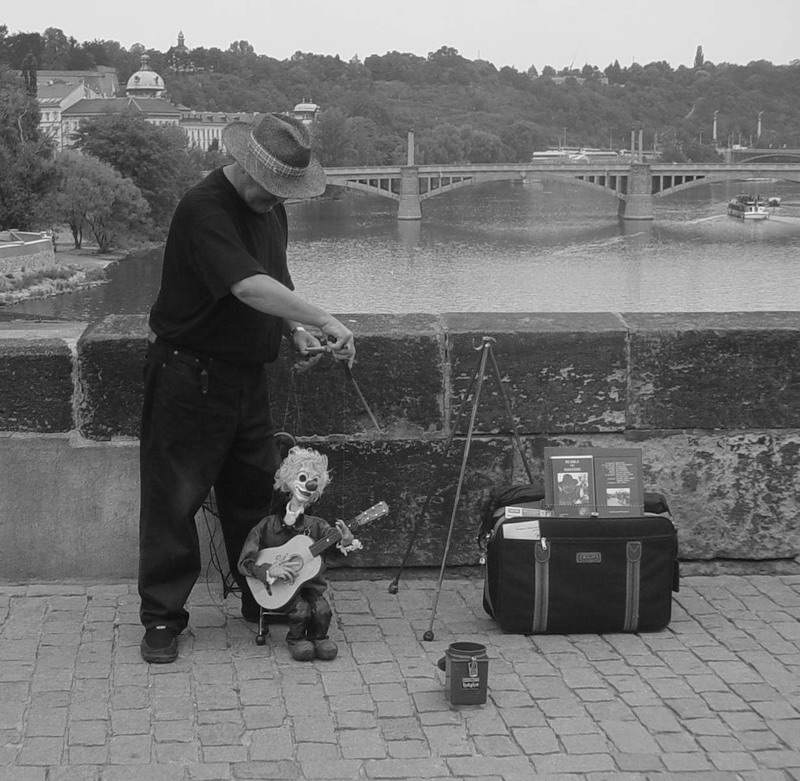
Marionette in Prague

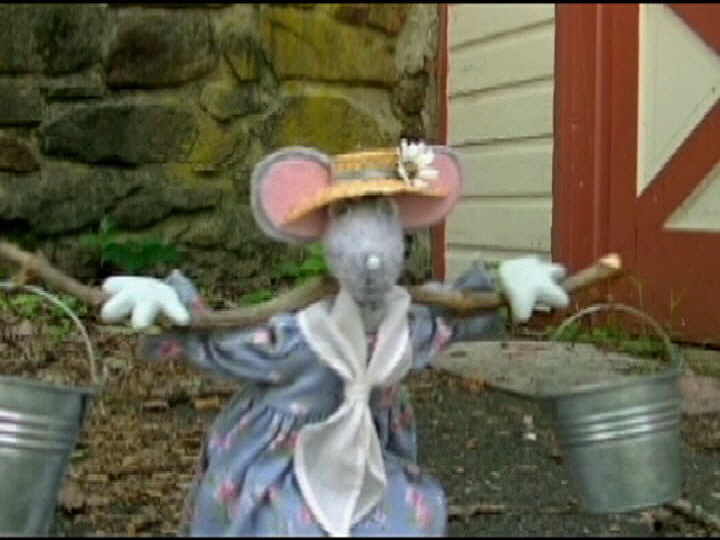
Marionettes in action in an instore app "A Tale of Two Mice" by Sydney Delle Donne

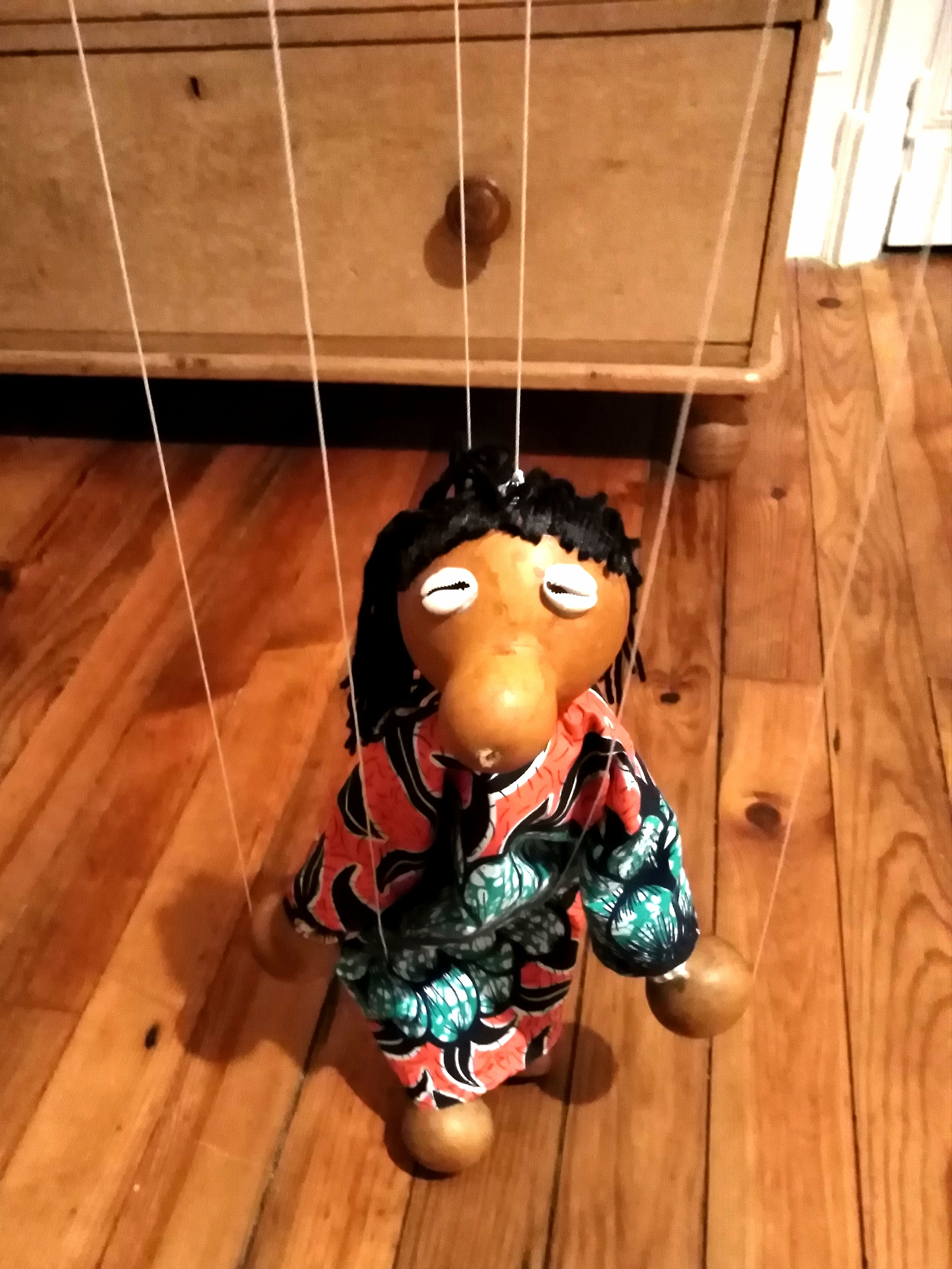
Calabash puppet

== See also ==
- Bunraku, traditional Japanese puppet theatre
- Buz-baz, traditional Afghan puppet show
- Digital puppetry, animated objects in a virtual environment rendered in real-time by computers
- Funeral March of a Marionette by Charles Gounod, best known as the theme music for Alfred Hitchcock Presents
- Shadow play, puppetry using silhouettes of flat puppets
- Supermarionation, film production technique using marionettes that can electronically lip sync to a pre-recorded dialogue.
- Water puppetry, Vietnamese traditional puppetry
- Ventriloquism
