= Danny Goldring =

American actor (1946–2022)

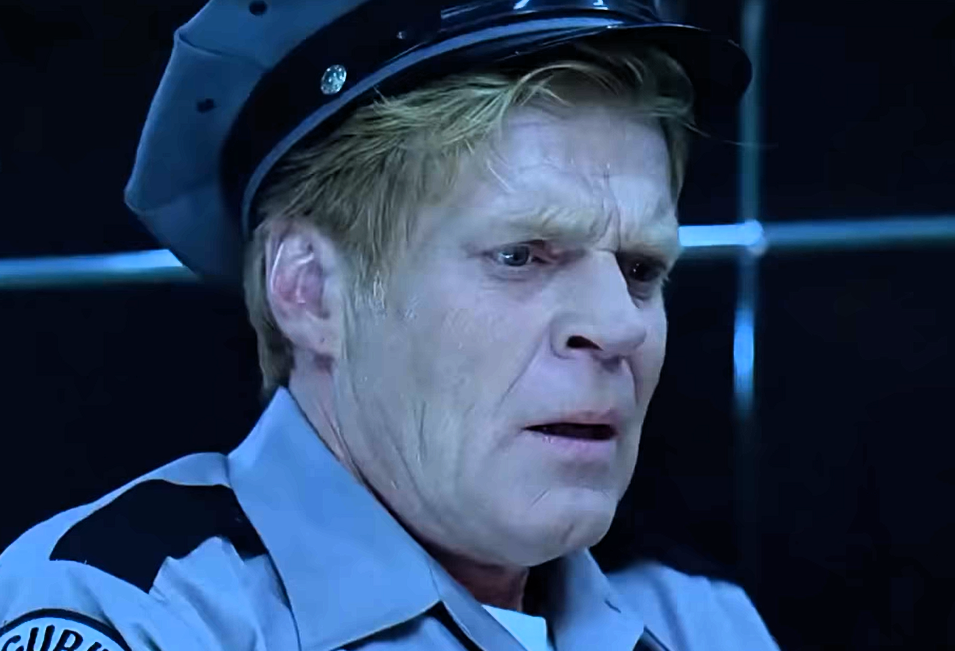
- Goldring as Security Buck in Bean (1997)
- Born: May 31, 1946; Woodstock, Illinois, U.S.
- Died: December 2, 2022 (aged 76); Los Angeles, California, U.S.
- Education: Trinity University
- Occupation: Actor

Danny Goldring (May 31, 1946 – December 2, 2022) was an American actor. He was best known for playing and Tom Kane's childhood friend Ryan Kavanaugh in the American political drama television series Boss.

== Life and career ==
Goldring was born in Woodstock, Illinois, the son of a United States Navy officer. He attended a preparatory school in Maryland. Goldring then attended Trinity University. At the age of 18, while Goldring was visiting some friends of his in New York, it was suggested to him that he should become an actor. Goldring served in the Signal Corps branch of the United States Army. After being discharged, he worked in construction in Maryland, where he made his stage debut in a production of A Thurber Carnival. Goldring worked as a puppeteer with the Cole Marionettes, with whom he toured for two years.

Goldring returned to Chicago, Illinois, in 1970. He attended The Theatre School at DePaul University, where he appeared in the stage play One Flew Over the Cuckoo's Nest. After leaving in 1973 he appeared in various radio and stage plays in Chicago.

Goldring began appearing in film and television in 1976, his first role being in the television film The Last Affair. He then appeared in the television soap opera Search for Tomorrow, playing Beau Mitchell. Goldring also played Hank in Texas. He has guest-starred in various television programs including ER, Matlock, Star Trek: Deep Space Nine, Star Trek: Voyager, Star Trek: Enterprise, NYPD Blue, Early Edition, Wings and The Practice. Goldring played the role of Major League baseball catcher and manager "Bill Carrigan" in the 1992 film The Babe. He co-starred and appeared in major films such as The Dark Knight (as masked bank robber "Grumpy"), Bean, Chicago Overcoat, Chain Reaction and The Fugitive.

In 2014, Goldring starred in the film Dig Two Graves, where he played Proctor. On stage, he played Detective Vince Getz in Big Lake Big City at the Lookingglass Theatre Company. His most recent role was in Adult Swim's Joe Pera Talks with You, where he played Grandpa 'Papa' Joe.

Goldring died on December 2, 2022, at the age of 76.

== Filmography ==
=== Film ===
Danny Goldring' film credits
| Year | Title | Role | Notes |
|---|---|---|---|
| 1976 | The Last Affair | Voice dubbing | |
| 1988 | Vice Versa | Motorcycle Cop | |
| 1988 | Above the Law | Zagon's Aide | |
| 1989 | The Package | Undercover Bum | |
| 1992 | The Babe | Bill Carrigan | |
| 1993 | The Fugitive | Head Illinois State Trooper | |
| 1997 | Bean | Security Buck | |
| 2008 | The Dark Knight | Grumpy | |
| 2019 | Captive State | Prison Guard | Final film role |

=== Television ===
Danny Goldring' television credits
| Year | Title | Role | Notes |
|---|---|---|---|
| 1978 | The Awakening Land | George Holcomb | Episode: "Part III: The Town" |
| 1995 | NYPD Blue | Sgt. McNamara | Episode: "Innuendo" |
| 1996 | Star Trek: Deep Space Nine | Burke | Episode: "...Nor the Battle to the Strong" |
| 2018-2019 | Joe Pera Talks with You | Grandpa 'Papa' JoePapa Joe | 2 episodes Final television role |
