= Cole Marionettes =

Chicago marionette troupe

The Cole Marionettes was a Chicago marionette troupe founded by George and Lucille Cole circa 1934. The Cole Marionettes had several companies touring schools throughout the Midwest from the 1930s through the late 1980s. Usually based on famous fairy tales and myths, typical productions included The Tinder Box, Jason and the Golden Fleece, The Steadfast Tin Soldier, Beauty and the Beast, Jack and the Beanstalk, and The Legend of Sleepy Hollow.

A lifelong circus enthusiast, George Cole created The Cole Circus, a popular marionette variety show touring for more than 40 years. George Cole died in 1986, preceding wife and partner Lucille's death by only a few years. Danny Goldring was among the many people who worked as Cole puppeteers over the years.
