= Chés Cabotans =

French marionette show

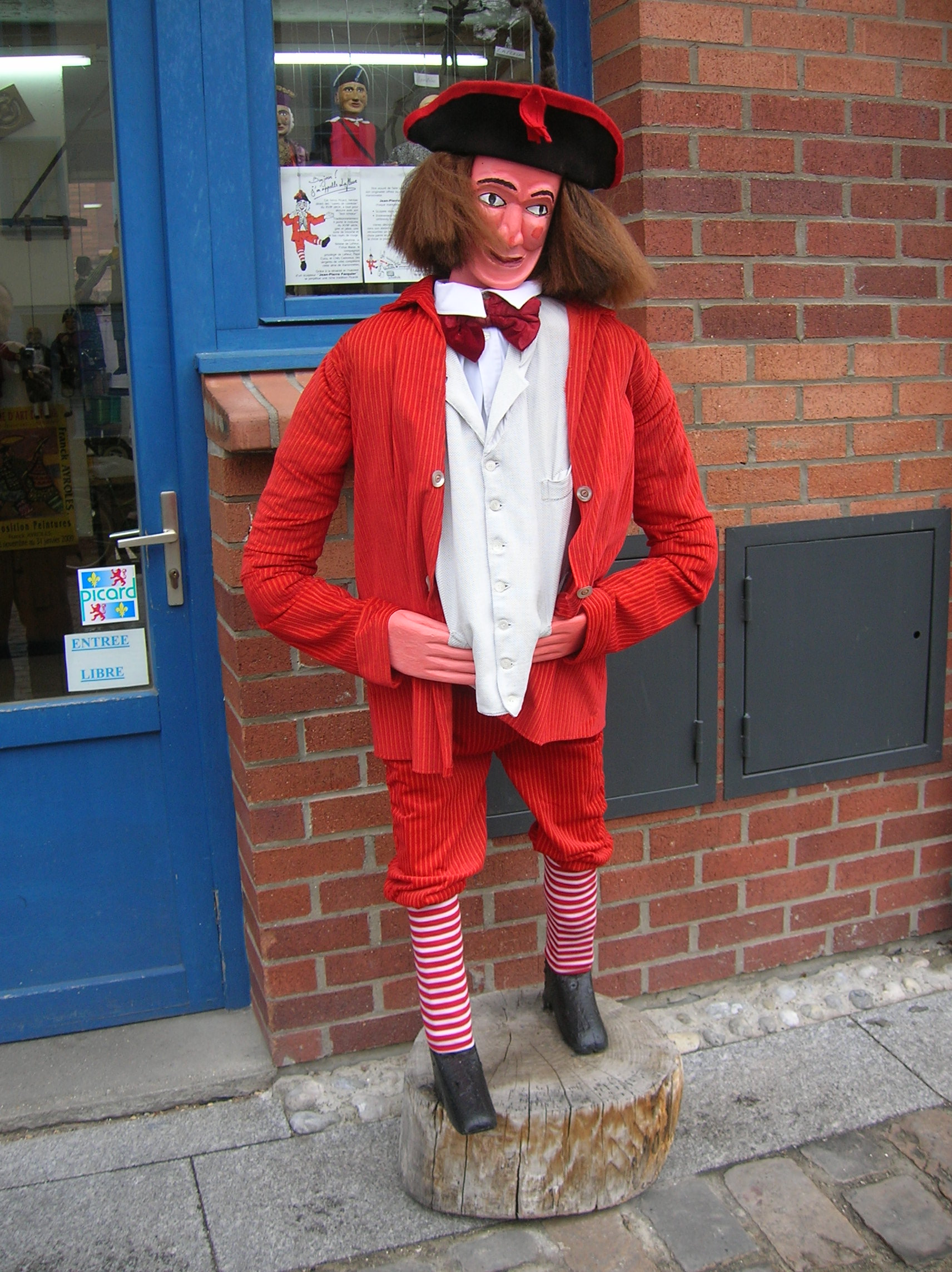
Lafleur before the shop of Jean-Pierre Facquier (sculptor of cabotans) in a street of Amiens

Chés Cabotans is a marionette show from the city of Amiens, France, performed in the French language and in the Picard language. Its main character is named Lafleur. Lafleur and his wife Sandrine speak Picard.

It is the last show of its type still in operation in Amiens. During the nineteenth century, the city was home to numerous performances of this sort.

== History ==
The troupe "Chés Cabotans d'Amiens" was founded in 1933 by Maurice Domon.

In 1997, the troupe took up residence in a specially-modified theatre, in the heart of the old working-class neighbourhood of Amiens' city centre.
