= Count Franz Graf von Pocci =

German painter

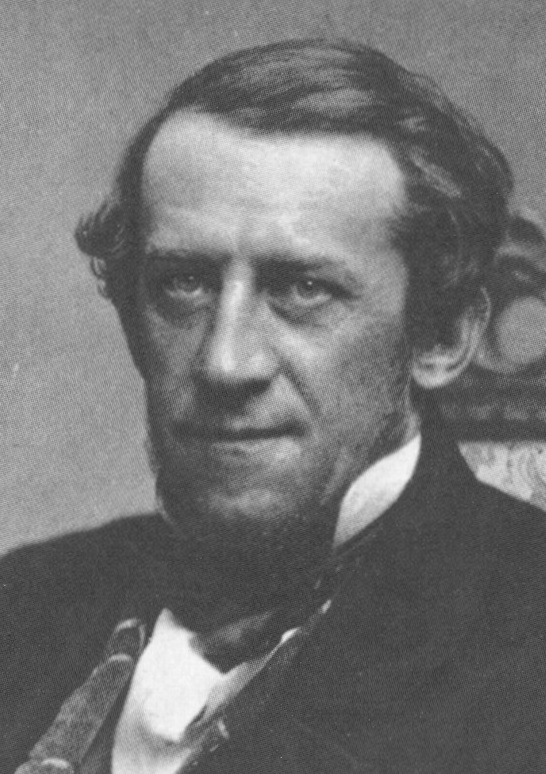
- Count Franz Graf von Pocci, Photograph by Franz Hanfstaengl, 1857
- Born: Franz Graf von Pocci; March 7, 1807
- Died: May 7, 1876 (aged 69); Munich, Bavaria, Germany
- Occupations: Author, Playwright, Courtier, Producer, Illustrator, Puppeteer, and Entrepreneur
- Writing career
- Genre: Children's literature
- Notable works: The Stranger Child: A Legend, Rhymes and Pictures for Children
- Literary movement: Marionette

Signature

Count Franz Graf von Pocci (7 March 1807 – 7 May 1876) was a significant official in the court of King Ludwig the First of Bavaria, best known as the founding director of the Munich Marionette Theatre where he was a shadow puppeteer and wrote countless puppet plays and children's stories.

Pocci, in collaboration with Josef Schmid, founded the Munich Marionette Theatre in Munich, Bavaria, Germany in 1855. He hired the premises, drew stage curtains and designs, and wrote pieces for the hero of Schmid's shows, Kasperl Larifari, a descendant of Hans Wurst and all the classical comic figures in traditional European puppetry. This collaboration was highly influential and is credited with inspiring the formation of other theaters, most notably the Salzburg Marionettes under Anton Aicher in 1913 in Salzburg, Bavaria, and the Toelz Marionette Theater.

== Work ==
A German dramatist, poet, painter, and composer, Pocci is credited by the Munich Marionette Theatre with inventing the Punch and Judy Show, and contributing a remarkable 45 original works to the theatre's library. Some were based on traditional classical plots, and some were his own inventions. Among his most prominent fairy‐tale plays are Blaubart (Bluebeard, 1845), Schattenspiel (Shadow Play, 1847), Hänsel und Gretel (Hansel and Gretel, 1861), Zaubergeige (The Magic Violin, 1868), Eulenschloss (The Castle of Owls, 1869), Kasperl wird reich (Punch Becomes Rich, 1872). Pocci combined comic features of the Punch and Judy shows with fantastic elements of the traditional fairy tales to create social farces aimed at enlightening and amusing children.

In addition to his literary work, his role as director saw him provide political and financial support to the organisation, acting as patron, landlord, and backer, and supporting the dreams of Schmid, his collaborator.

He was also responsible for drawing illustrations for collections of fairy tales by Charles Perrault, the Brothers Grimm, and Hans Christian Andersen. Figures from his productions of The Fat Gentleman and The Serenade are still in existence today, and his best known stories The Stranger Child: A Legend and The Nutcracker Dwarf are still in wide circulation.

Pocci's art and poetry were also published in his own books, including Rhymes and Pictures for Children and Viola Tricolor: In Picture and Rhyme. His images from the latter are printed in chromolithography. He is responsible for both the art and the verse in the book, and both are noteworthy.

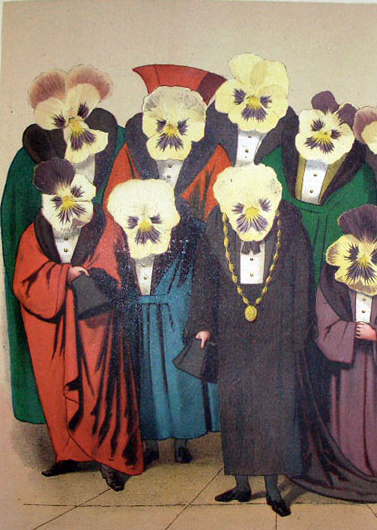
A chromolithograph by Pocci from Viola Tricolor

Faculty Professors

Here stand the University chaps,
In their grand official gowns and caps;
And thinks full sure, each learned elf:

“The cleverest here? - ‘tis I myself!”

— Count Franz von Pocci, Viola Tricolor

The Painter at His Easel

Thus many a painter once gay and glad,
Sits before his picture, and says full sad:
“Oh had I but turn’d this work in to cash!”

“But nobody buys since the last great smash!”

— Count Franz von Pocci, Viola Tricolor

== Bibliography ==
- Salzburg Marionetten Theater. Salzburg, Austria: Salzburg Marionette Theater. 2004.
- Pocci, Franz (1876). Viola tricolor: in picture and rhyme. Stroefer & Kirchner.
- Dreyer, A (1907). Franz Pocci, der Dichter. Berlin: Künstler und Kinderfruend.
- Lucas, A (1929). Franz Pocci und das Kinderbuch. Künstler und Kinderfruend.
- The Bad Toelz Theatre Company (2001). "The History of the Bad Toelz Theatre Company". The Bad Toelz Theatre Company. Archived from the original on 30 March 2012.
- Munich Marionette Theatre Company (2009). "The History of the Munich Marionette Theatre". Munich Marionette Theatre Company.
- Simmen, Rene (1975). The World Of Puppets. London: Phaidon Press Ltd. ISBN 0-7290-0037-0.
