= Salzburg Marionette Theatre =

Puppet theatre in Austria

Coordinates: 47°48′12″N 13°02′33″E

Salzburg Marionette Theatre was established in 1913 and is one of the oldest continuing marionette theatres in the world. It is based in the city of Salzburg, Austria. Original productions featured live actors and musicians. Today soundtracks are recorded. The Salzburg Marionette Theatre performs a large repertoire of operas, ballets and productions for both children and adults, using marionettes.

The Salzburg Marionette Theatre was founded as the Aicher Family Theatre, and has continued to this day delighting both children and adults. Over 2,600 performances have played all over the world, including Carnegie Hall.

== History ==
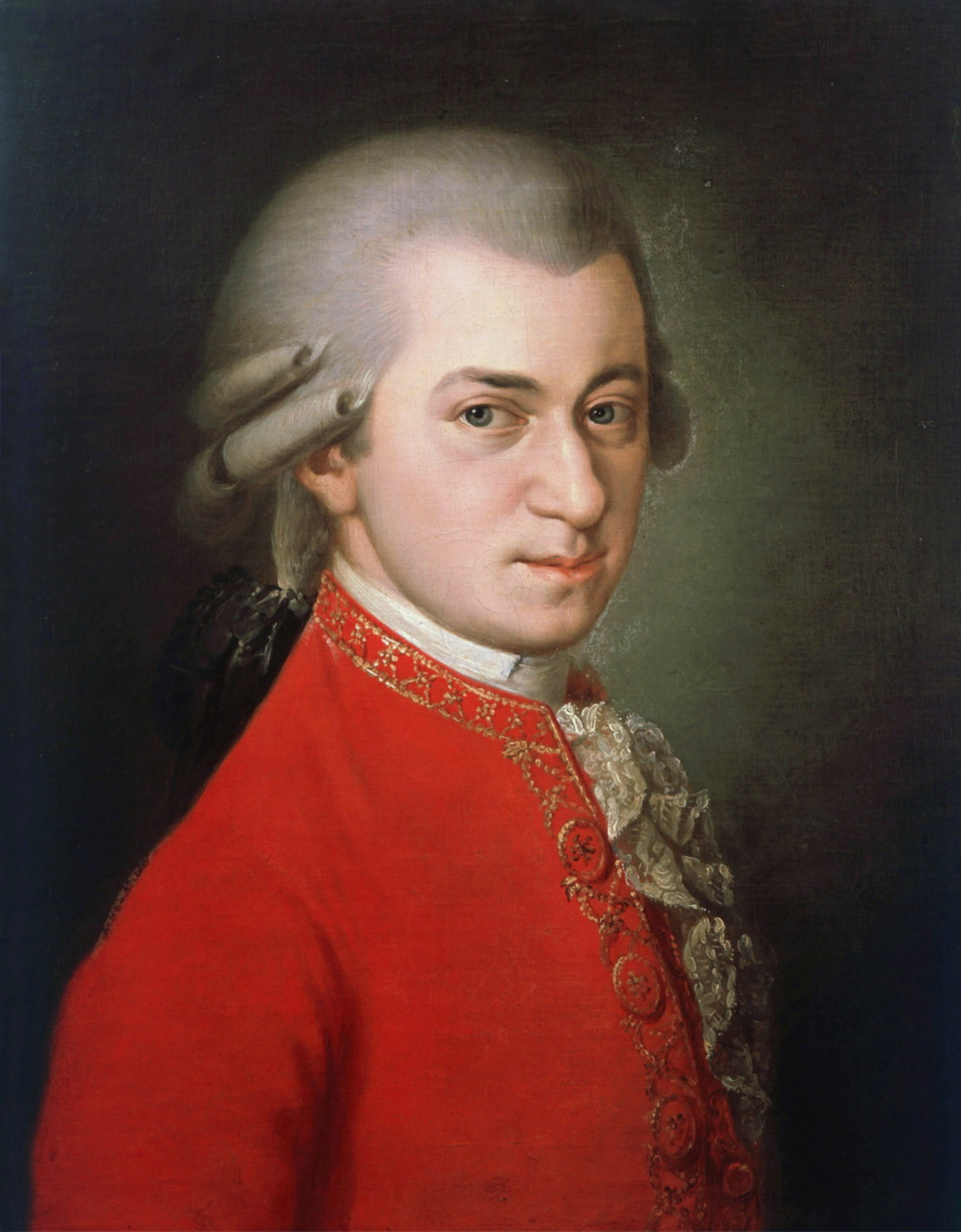
Many of Mozart's famous operas are in the repertoire of the Salzburg Marionette Theatre (Posthumous painting by Barbara Krafft in 1819)

=== Anton Aicher ===
The Salzburg Marionette Theatre was founded in 1913 by Professor Anton Aicher. The original production was Bastien and Bastienne, a marionette version of Mozart's famous comic opera of that name. The company repertoire expanded the following year to incorporate thirteen additional productions.

The Salzburg Marionette Theatre grew more adventurous and started to tour its productions abroad, starting in Hamburg, Germany in 1927. The company made further tours to the Balkan countries. In 1936, it toured the Soviet Union visiting Moscow and Leningrad. As a sign of artistic excellence, the company was awarded the Gold Medal at the 1937 World's Fair in Paris. In 1938, the year of the Anschluss, the Salzburg Marionette Theatre made an extensive tour of Germany and Sweden.

During World War II, the government instructed the Salzburg Marionette Theatre to make tours of frontline areas and the troupe performed in German-occupied Norway, Poland, Russia and Romania until it was forced to cease operations in 1944.

=== Herman Aichel ===
With Hermann Aicher's return from the war, the Salzburg Marionette Theatre started performing again for the occupying American, British and French military forces. In 1947, the troupe marked its first German language performances in Paris. The company toured extensively throughout the 1950s and in 1950 the company began to use recorded sound for performances, instead of live actors and musicians. The troupe began its first tour of the United States in 1952 under a five-year contract. International touring became a permanent feature of the company, in addition to regular performances in Salzburg.

=== Own theatre ===
The Salzburg Marionette Theatre had performed in a variety of venues until 1971 when the company acquired its own theatre in the former ballroom of the Mirabell Hotel. The first production there was Rossini's Barber of Seville. For the sixtieth anniversary of the founding, two years later, the company and its unique work was the subject of a documentary film.

=== Gretl Aicher ===
In 1977, the driving force behind the Salzburg Marionette Theatre, Hermann Aicher died. Artistic control passed to Gretl Aicher.

To mark the seventieth birthday of Gretl Aicher and the eighty-fifth anniversary of the Salzburg Marionette Theatre, a special exhibition of marionettes opened at the Salzburg Hohensalzburg Fortress. Since that time, the company has continued to tour and perform in its own theatre with an ever increasing repertoire of productions featuring not just the works of Mozart, but also many other famous composers such as Johann Strauss and Tchaikovsky.

The company revived its production of Bastien and Bastienne in 2007 and premiered a new production of The Sound of Music, directed by Richard Hamburger. Salzburg was home of the Von Trapp family and was featured heavily in the 1965 film production of the same name starring Julie Andrews and Christopher Plummer.
