= National Marionette Theatre =

Theatre company in the Czech Republic

- Národní divadlo marionet
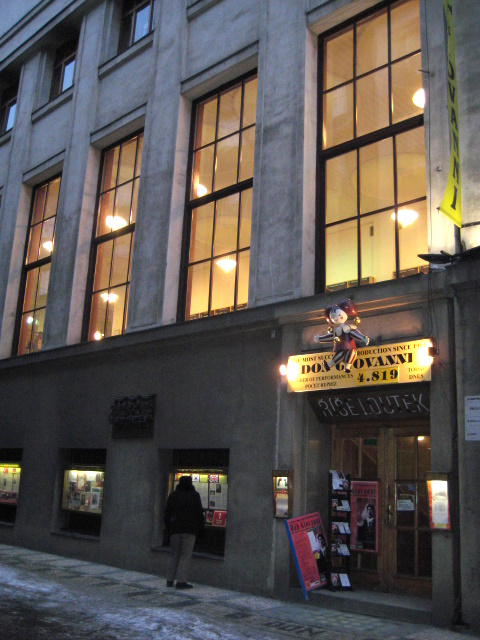
- Street view of the exterior
- Interactive map of National Marionette Theatre
- Address: Žatecká 98 /1; Prague 1 Czech Republic
- Coordinates: 50.0876944°N 14.4176867°E

Construction
- Opened: 1991

The National Marionette Theatre (Czech: Národní divadlo marionet, NDM) is a theatre company devoted to puppetry performances, located in the Old Town neighborhood of Prague, Czech Republic. The company has been active since June 1991, but uses a historical puppetry space called Říše loutek (Kingdom of the Puppets) that dates to at least 1929, when it hosted the founding of the Union Internationale de la Marionnette

The company generally stages adaptations of classic opera and theatre, with the most successful serial production thus far being Don Giovanni, which uses period costume and has a run of over 6500. There are shows nearly every evening. Due to the popularity of the production and the steady demand from the tourist market, additional companies have recently been developed in the area, in some cases trading on their similarity to the original NDM.
