= Anton Aicher =

Austrian artistic director (1859–1930)

Anton Aicher (1859 – 5 February 1930) was the founding Artistic Director of the Salzburg Marionette Theatre. He founded the company in 1913 and was its leader until his death.

== Background ==
Aicher was born in a small village in southern Styria in Austria. His talent for carving was recognised at an early age and he was sent to study with the well known maker of altar pieces. His interest in figures in motion took him to Munich to one of the masters of puppetry Papa Schmid.

== Influences ==
One of the greatest influences on Aicher was the work of Count Franz Pocci, founder of the Munich Marionette Theatre.

== Salzburg Marionette Theatre ==
In 1913, Aicher founded the Salzburg Marionette Theatre. The company opened on 27 February 1913 with a production of Mozart's opera, Bastien and Bastienne . In October of the same year, Aicher hired the gymnasium of the Borromaeum seminary and installed his company there. The venue was the home of the Salzburg Marionette Theatre for 49 years.

World War I did not interrupt the workings of the theatre company. In 1926, Aicher handed over the management of the theatre to his son, Hermann Aicher. 1927 saw the first tour of the company to Hamburg, Germany. This tour started a tradition that still continues today.

== Legacy ==
Professor Anton Aicher's company continues to flourish today under the artistic direction of his granddaughter, Gretl Aicher.

== Books and articles ==
- Salzburg Marionetten Theater. Salzburg, Austria: Salzburg Marionette Theater. 2004.
- Logan, David (2007). Puppetry. Brisbane, Queensland, Australia: Brisbane Dramatic Arts Company. ISBN 978-0-9804563-0-1.
