= Miroslav Trejtnar =

Miroslav Trejtnar at work in his studio in Prague, Czech Republic

Miroslav Trejtnar (born 5 April 1962 in Rychnov nad Kněžnou, Czechoslovakia) is a master puppeteer and teacher of puppetry.

== Background ==
Trejtnar has a long connection with puppetry. He concentrated on woodcarving at the Arts and Crafts High School in Prague. From there he went on to study puppet design at the Department of Alternative and Puppet Theatre at the Academy of Performing Arts in Prague. Miroslav also spent time training at the Institut UNIMA in Charleville-Mézières, France. He also worked with the Bread and Puppet Theater, USA.

== Career highlights ==
In 1999, Trejtnar founded the KID Company which is devoted to designing and producing traditional Czech wooden puppets, toys and sculptures. His puppets have been displayed by invitation at the UNIMA 2000 World Festival in Magdeburg, Germany. Trejtnar has been commissioned to design and make puppets for a large range of productions in the Czech Republic and elsewhere. Highlights have included working for the Forman brothers on their production of 'Baroque Opera' as well as for the renowned Jiří Trnka animation studios in Prague. 1996 was a special year for Trejtnar as he received the Bavarian Design Award at the Munich International Crafts Fair.

== Master Puppeteer and Teacher of Puppetry ==
Puppetry students of Miroslav Trejtnar, January 2007

Trejtnar is one of few remaining teachers of the art of designing and making traditional Czech marionettes. His courses are in great demand. He also has great knowledge as a manipulator of different styles of puppetry. Puppeteers come from all around the world to have the chance to work with and learn from him. Apart from operating his own studio in Prague, Trejtnar has been invited to lecture in puppet making and design at the Academy of Performing Arts in Prague, St. Martin's College of Design, London and also in Portugal and Hong Kong. Many of his students work as professional puppeteers and teachers of puppetry in schools around the world. Every year, Trejtnar works with students on a puppet creation and performance project called Teatrotoč.
