= Personnel of the United States Navy =

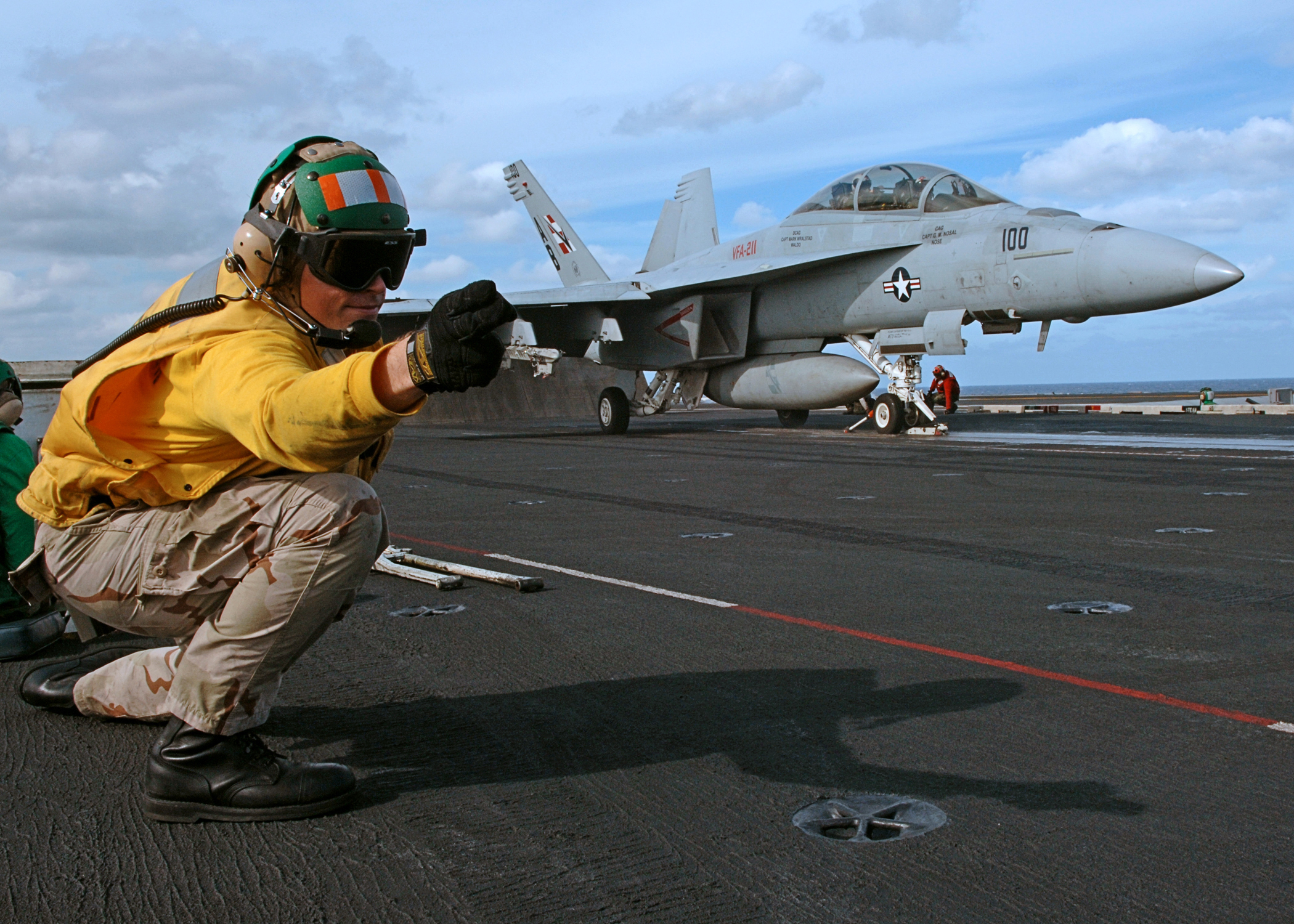
A "shooter" in working uniform gives the signal to launch an F/A-18 Super Hornet from USS Enterprise (CVN-65)

The United States Navy has nearly 500,000 personnel, approximately a quarter of whom are in ready reserve. Of those on active duty, more than eighty percent are enlisted sailors, and around fifteen percent are commissioned officers; the rest are midshipmen of the United States Naval Academy and United States Merchant Marine Academy and midshipmen of the Naval Reserve Officer Training Corps at over 180 universities around the country and officer candidates at the navy's Officer Candidate School.

Sailors prove they have mastered skills and deserve responsibilities by completing Personnel Qualification Standards (PQS) tasks and examinations. Among the most important is the "warfare qualification," which denotes a journeyman level of capability in Surface Warfare, Aviation Warfare, Naval Aircrew, Special Warfare, Submarine Warfare or Expeditionary Warfare. Many qualifications are denoted on a sailor's uniform with U.S. Navy badges and insignia.

== Commissioned officer ==
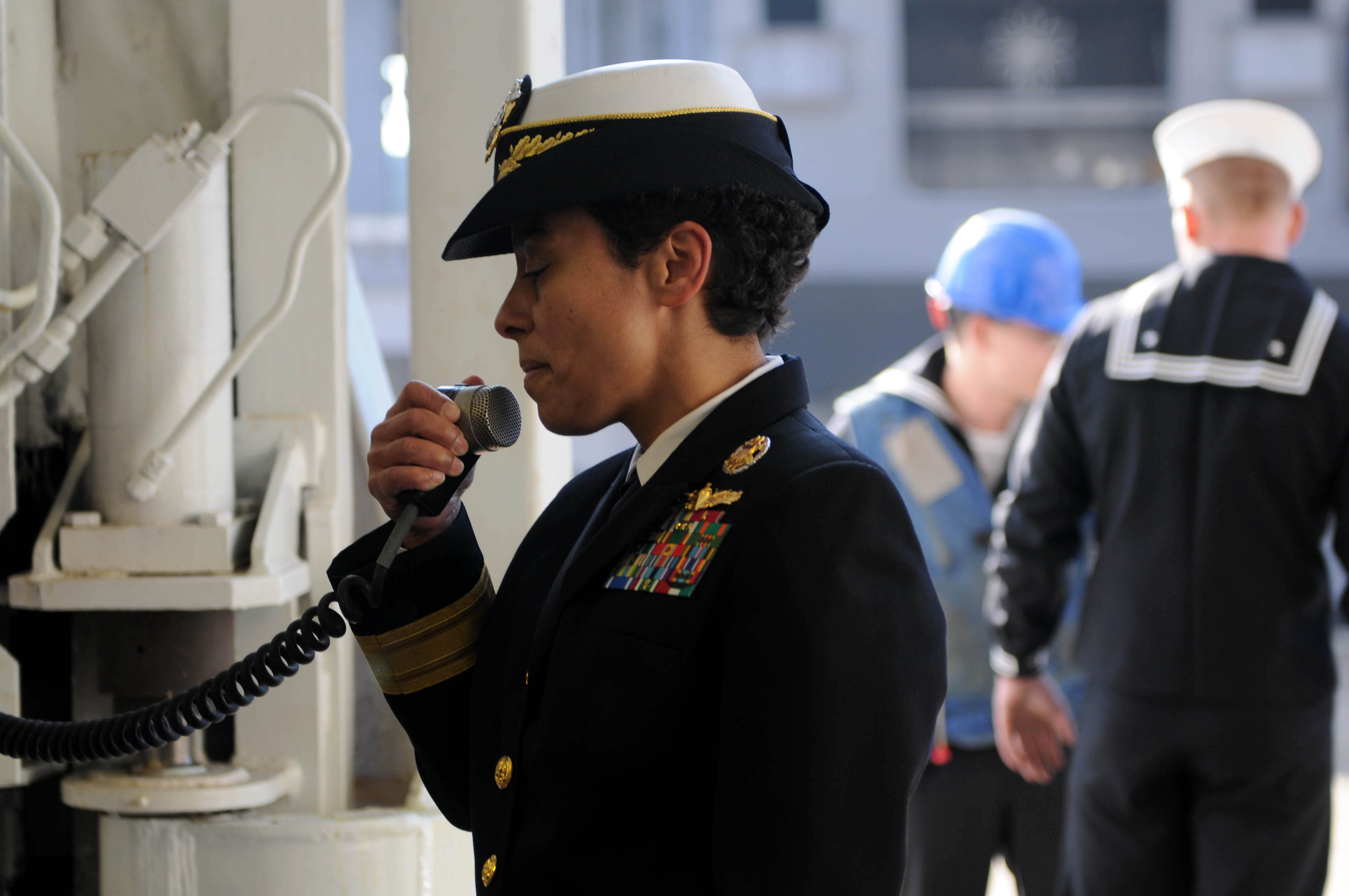
Then-Rear Admiral (lower half) Michelle J. Howard addresses the crew of USS Wasp (LHD-1) in 2009. Howard would later rise to the rank of Admiral.

Commissioned officers in the navy have pay grades ranging from O-1 to O-10, with O-10 being the highest; those with paygrades between O-1 through O-3 are considered junior officers and O-4 and O-6 as senior officers. Officers in the O-7 to O-10 range are called flag officers or "the admiralty". Promotion through O-8 is based on performance in an officer's current paygrade, which is recorded in "FITREPS" (fitness reports). Promotions to Vice Admiral (O-9) and Admiral (O-10) are based on assignment to specific positions and subject to U.S. Senate confirmation. Above the rank of admiral is Fleet Admiral, which was awarded to only four officers in World War II and is intended to be used only during a declared war. In 1899, a special rank called Admiral of the Navy was created for Admiral George Dewey, a war hero of the Spanish–American War, with the condition that it would cease to exist upon his death. Commissioned officers originate from the United States Naval Academy, Naval Reserve Officer Training Corps (NROTC), Officer Candidate School (OCS), and a host of other commissioning programs such as the Seaman to admiral-21 program, the Limited Duty Officer and Chief Warrant Officer Selection Programs, the United States Merchant Marine Academy, or receive direct commissions via Officer Development School (ODS) or from its reserve component, the Direct Commission Officer School (DCO School).

Commissioned officers can generally be divided into line officers and staff corps; line officers can be further split into unrestricted and restricted communities. Unrestricted Line Officers are the warfighting command element and are authorized to command ships, aviation squadrons and air wings, and special operations units. Restricted Line Officers, on the other hand, concentrate on non-combat related fields, such as engineering and maintenance; they are not qualified to command combat units. Staff Corps officers are specialists in fields that are themselves professional careers and not exclusive to the military, for example: medicine, science, law, and civil engineering. Staff officers typically serve on the staff of their line officer counterparts to provide professional advice. Navy line officers are promoted based on an "up or out" system. The Defense Officer Personnel Management Act of 1980 establishes uniform rules for timing of promotions and limits the number of officers that can serve in the navy at any given time.

US DoD pay grade	Special grade (Note: Reserved for wartime use only.)	O-10	O-9	O-8	O-7	O-6	O-5	O-4	O-3	O-2	O-1
NATO code	OF-10	OF-9	OF-8	OF-7	OF-6	OF-5	OF-4	OF-3	OF-2	OF-1
Collar insignia
Shoulder insignia
Sleeve insignia
Title	Fleet admiral	Admiral	Vice admiral	Rear admiral	Rear admiral (lower half)	Captain	Commander	Lieutenant commander	Lieutenant	Lieutenant (junior grade)	Ensign
Abbreviation	FADM	ADM	VADM	RADM	RDML	CAPT	CDR	LCDR	LT	LTJG	ENS

== Chief Warrant Officer ==
Chief Warrant Officer (CWO) pay grades range from W-1 to the highest rank of W-5. United States Navy CWOs are officers whose role is to provide leadership and skills for the most difficult and demanding operations in a very specific technical specialty. They occupy a niche that is not as well served by the line officer community, who tend to have a broader command focus. CWOs come from the non-commissioned officer ranks of the enlisted and receive their commission after completing the Chief Warrant Officer Program. They typically become CWOs in specialties that are most related to their previous enlisted rating. Like Staff Corps officers, CWOs wear special insignia above the rank devices on their shoulder boards and sleeves to indicate their field of expertise.

US DoD pay grade	W-5	W-4	W-3	W-2	W-1
NATO code	WO-5	WO-4	WO-3	WO-2	WO-1
Collar insignia
Shoulder insignia
Sleeve insignia
Title	Chief warrant officer 5	Chief warrant officer 4	Chief warrant officer 3	Chief warrant officer 2	Warrant officer 1
Abbreviation	CWO-5	CWO-4	CWO-3	CWO-2	WO-1

== Enlisted sailors ==
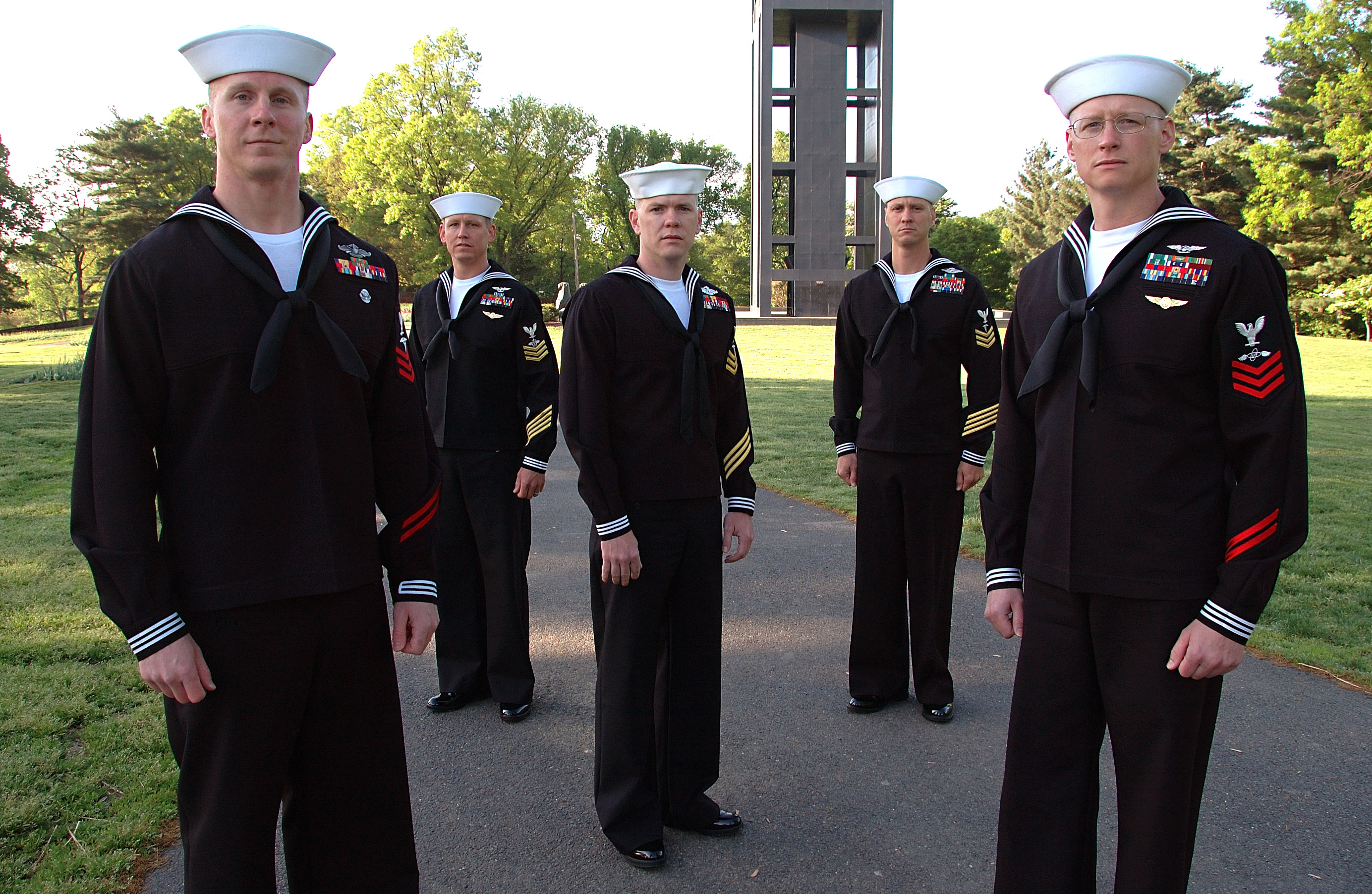
Petty Officers wearing service dress uniforms pose for a photograph in front of the Netherlands Carillon at Arlington National Cemetery.

Enlisted members of the navy have pay grades from E-1 to E-9, with E-9 being the highest. All enlisted sailors with paygrades of E-4 and higher are considered Petty Officers while those at E-7 and higher are further named Chief Petty Officers. Those who demonstrate superior performance are given an increase in paygrade; the official navy term is to be advanced. Two notable advancements are from Seaman to Petty Officer Third Class (E-3 to E-4) and from Petty Officer First Class to Chief Petty Officer (E-6 to E-7). Advancement to Chief Petty Officer is especially significant and is marked by a special induction ceremony.

Enlisted members are said to be "rated", meaning that they possess a rating, or occupational specialty. Members of grades E-1 to E-3 can become "strikers", meaning they have rating designations like Petty Officer (example: a BM3 is a Petty Officer Third Class rated as a Boatswain's Mate; BMSN is a Seaman designated as a Boatswain's Mate striker), but the striker is doing on the job training to become a rated petty officer rather than attending a school to become rated. There are more than 50 ratings covering a broad range of skills and subspecialties. However, most sailors in today's navy with grades E-1 through E-6 obtain their rating through its respective "A" school. An "A" school is a rating specific school where sailors are trained as experts in their field. Upon completion of their training they are considered "Rated", regardless of their pay grade.

For example, SA TESTER, MARY, would be considered a Seaman Apprentice Tester. Prior to her rank of SA a rating would be placed. Therefore, her entire title would be ITSA SMITH, MARY, IT indicating that she is an Information Systems Technician and SA indicating that she is a Seaman Apprentice (pay grade E-2). As for ENFN THOMPSON, JOHN, EN specifies that he is an Engineman and FN as a Fireman (pay grade E-3). Another example would be ATAN JACKSON, DAVID, AT specifying he is an Aviation Electronics Technician and AN as an Airman (pay grade E-3).

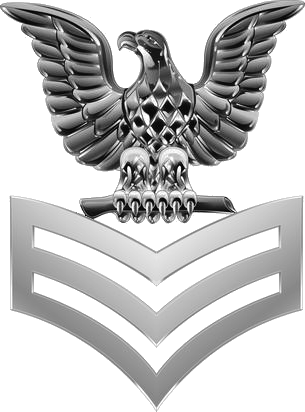
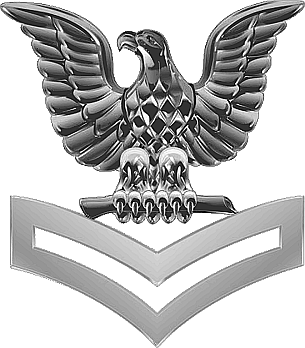
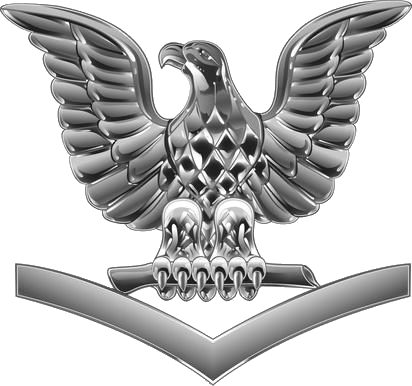
US DoD pay grade	E-9 Special (Note: SEAC and MCPON have E-9 pay grades but are given unique pay.)		E-9			E-8		E-7	E-6	E-5	E-4	E-3	E-2	E-1
NATO code	OR-9					OR-8		OR-7	OR-6	OR-5	OR-4	OR-3	OR-2	OR-1
Collar insignia														No insignia
Sleeve insignia														No insignia
Title	Senior Enlisted Advisor to the Chairman	Master Chief Petty Officer of the Navy	Fleet/force master chief petty officer	Command master chief petty officer	Master chief petty officer	Command senior chief petty officer	Senior chief petty officer	Chief petty officer	Petty officer first class	Petty officer second class	Petty officer third class	Seaman	Seaman apprentice	Seaman recruit
Abbreviation	SEAC	MCPON	FLTCM/FORCM	CMDCM	MCPO	CMDCS	SCPO	CPO	PO1	PO2	PO3	SN	SA	SR

== Uniforms and appearance ==
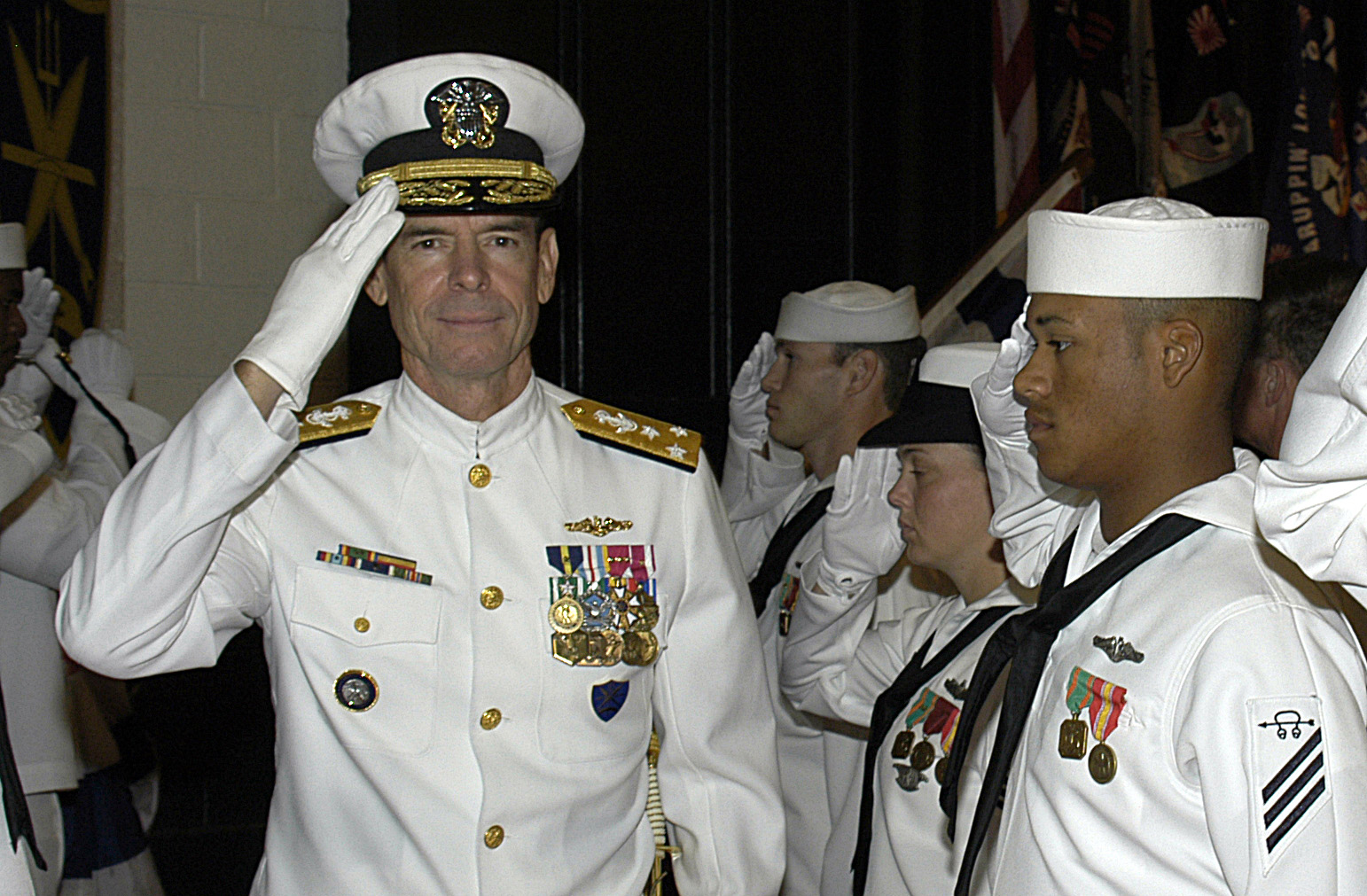
A Vice Admiral returns salute from enlisted sailors in dress uniform at a ceremony.

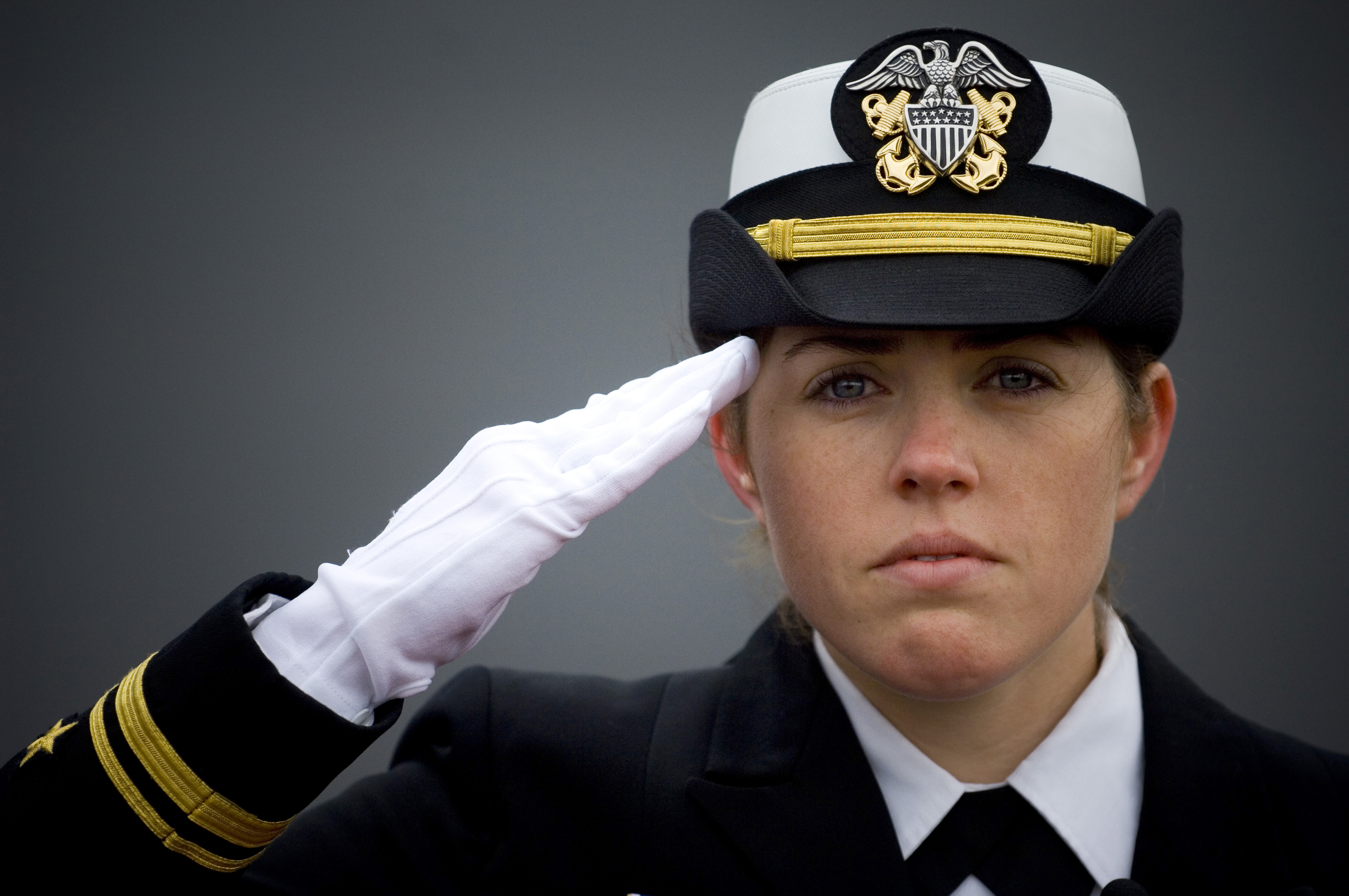
Lieutenant, Junior Grade Shaina Hayden renders a salute in November 2008.

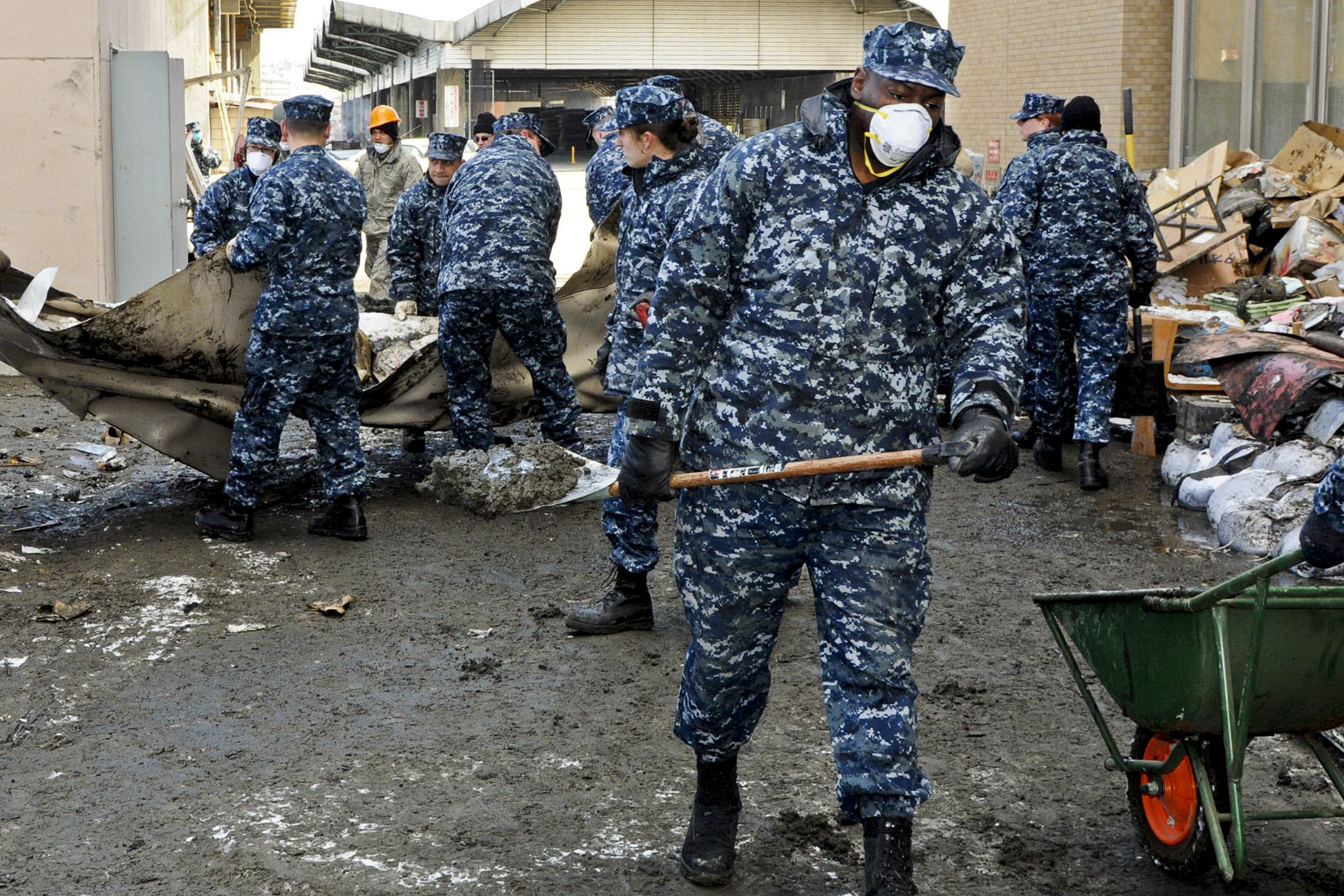
Sailors wearing the Navy Working Uniform during cleanup efforts in Japan after the 2011 tsunami.

The uniforms of the United States Navy are designed "to combine professionalism and naval heritage with versatility, safety, and comfort". The Navy currently incorporates many different styles that are specific for a variety of uses and occasions. In most cases, distinctions are made to distinguish officers and enlisted men in their uniformed appearance. U.S. Navy uniforms can generally be divided into three categories: dress uniforms, service uniforms, and working uniforms.

- Dress uniforms are worn during military-related formal occasions, such as ceremonies and other official functions. Many types of dress uniforms are used in the navy with the full range of formal requirements represented. Service dress is the least formal dress uniform, full dress is one step higher in formality, and mess dress is the most formal dress available.
- Service uniforms are designed for daily wear and are most often worn in office or classroom-type settings, as well as other occasions in which physical activity is at a minimum. The most visible distinction between officers and enlisted personnel is the color of the service uniform. Only officers and chief petty officers are authorized to wear Service Khaki or Service White; all other personnel must wear the Navy Service Uniform (which will eventually replace Winter Blue and Summer White).
- Working uniforms prioritize comfort and safety first and thus are the most utilitarian of the navy uniforms. They are intended for use in underway ships and in occasions that involve dirty, physical labor. Many working uniforms are variations of the service uniforms except with less formal requirements. This category includes navy coveralls, which are authorized to be worn by members of all ranks.

In the 2000s, the navy completed a project named "Task Force Uniform" to streamline navy uniforms. Among the changes were that enlisted personnel from Seaman Recruit to Petty Officer First Class (E1–E6) will have one year-round service uniform instead of winter blues and summer whites. All personnel from Seaman Recruit to admiral will also have new working uniforms dubbed Navy Working Uniform (NWU) to replace the wash khakis, coveralls, utilities, and aviation working greens then in use. The uniform was a digital patterned camouflage in predominantly haze gray and blue hues.

Grooming for both male and female sailors is regulated to a high degree, with exact standards in regards to hair, facial hair, use of cosmetics, and jewelry. New male recruits are given the military crew cut and are prohibited from having hair longer than four inches (102 mm) while in the service. Men are required to be clean shaven at all times, although mustaches are allowed. Women do not have a hair length regulation, however hair cannot fall past the bottom edge of the uniform collar and the style of hair is strictly controlled. Multicolored hair, body piercing, and tattoos on the head, neck, and hands are banned for both sexes.
