= Gretl Aicher =

Gretl Aicher (July 19, 1928 – March 14, 2012) was the Artistic Director of the Salzburg Marionette Theatre.

== Background ==
Gretl Aicher took over the position of Artistic Director of the famous Salzburg Marionette Theatre in 1977 on the death of the former director, Hermann Aicher. With her father she has been linked for a considerable time with the success of the company. Her grandfather, Anton Aicher founded the company in 1913. To mark the 70th birthday of Gretl Aicher and the 85th anniversary of the Salzburg Marionette Theatre, a special exhibition of marionettes was opened at the Salzburg Hohensalzburg Fortress.

Aicher has commented on her last passion with puppetry,

What, then, is the fascination of life with marionettes? Is it the pleasure of performing? The appeal of mastering an "instrument" to the point of virtuosity? The transformation of one's own self? For me, it is the process of empathising with mind and soul, of feeling at one with music and movement that bring these much loved creatures to life. The marionette makes possible undreamt of effects of dramatic imagination, which can never be achieved on the full-size "human" stage.

== Books and articles ==
- Salzburg Marionetten Theater. Salzburg, Austria: Salzburg Marionette Theater. 2004.
- Billington, Michael (1988). Performing Arts: A Guide To Practice And Appreciation. London: New Burlington Books. ISBN 1-85348-115-7.
- Currell, David (1985). The Complete Book of Puppetry. London: A & C Black (Publishers) Ltd. ISBN 0-7136-2429-9.
- Logan, David (2007). Puppetry. Brisbane, Queensland, Australia: Brisbane Dramatic Arts Company. ISBN 978-0-9804563-0-1.
