= Wayang =

Java-origin cultural performance

Wayang (in Javanese); Wayaṅ (in Old Javanese); ꦮꦪꦁ (Javanese); ᬯᬬᬂ (Balinese); ᮝᮚᮀ (Sundanese)
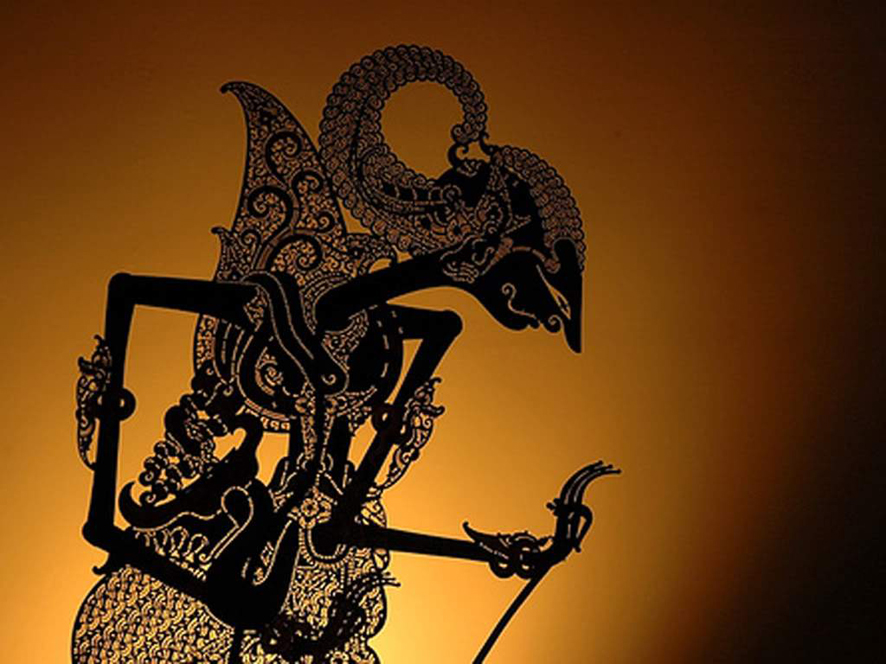
- Types: Traditional (dramatic) performance
- Ancestor arts: Javanese
- Descendant arts: Wayang wong, Wayang kulit, Wayang golek, Wayang beber, Wayang klitik
- Originating culture: Javanese (Java-origin Native Indonesian)
- Originating era: Ancient Java

While Wayang is a way of telling stories, it is also an important part of Indonesian culture, then and now. Many believe that preserving this type of theater is important in order to maintain the heritage of the culture. This way of storytelling helps to convey stories of cultural and moral significance. Every performance is an intricate web of symbols and allegories, where the audience can also be morally and spiritually enriched as well as be entertained. Wayang should not just be looked at through the lens of it being a form of art. It should be seen as another alternative way to educate people on the culture and stories of these peoples. The main issue with this art style and maintaining it in the modern day is the fact that it is not attracting as much of the younger audience anymore.

One way to combat this is by converting these stories and this way of theater into more modern pieces. For example scholars have developed ways to make the visuals and stories of Wayang more appealing to the younger generation. When conducting surveys they found that when changing and playing with the illustrations more, audiences were more likely to feel engaged in the work rather than becoming disinterested. Such illustrations take the original elements of Wayang and adapt them into a more contemporary style. Some main insights into these surveys that they got was that while younger audiences are not the most familiar, they find that the visuals such as the colors, character designs, and detail are fascinating and would be more interesting to look at with audio and visual enhancements. This goes to show that while people in the modern day respond to things they understand now more than past times, there is still a desire there to make progress while also preserving traditional roots.

Preserving and Maintaining Heritage

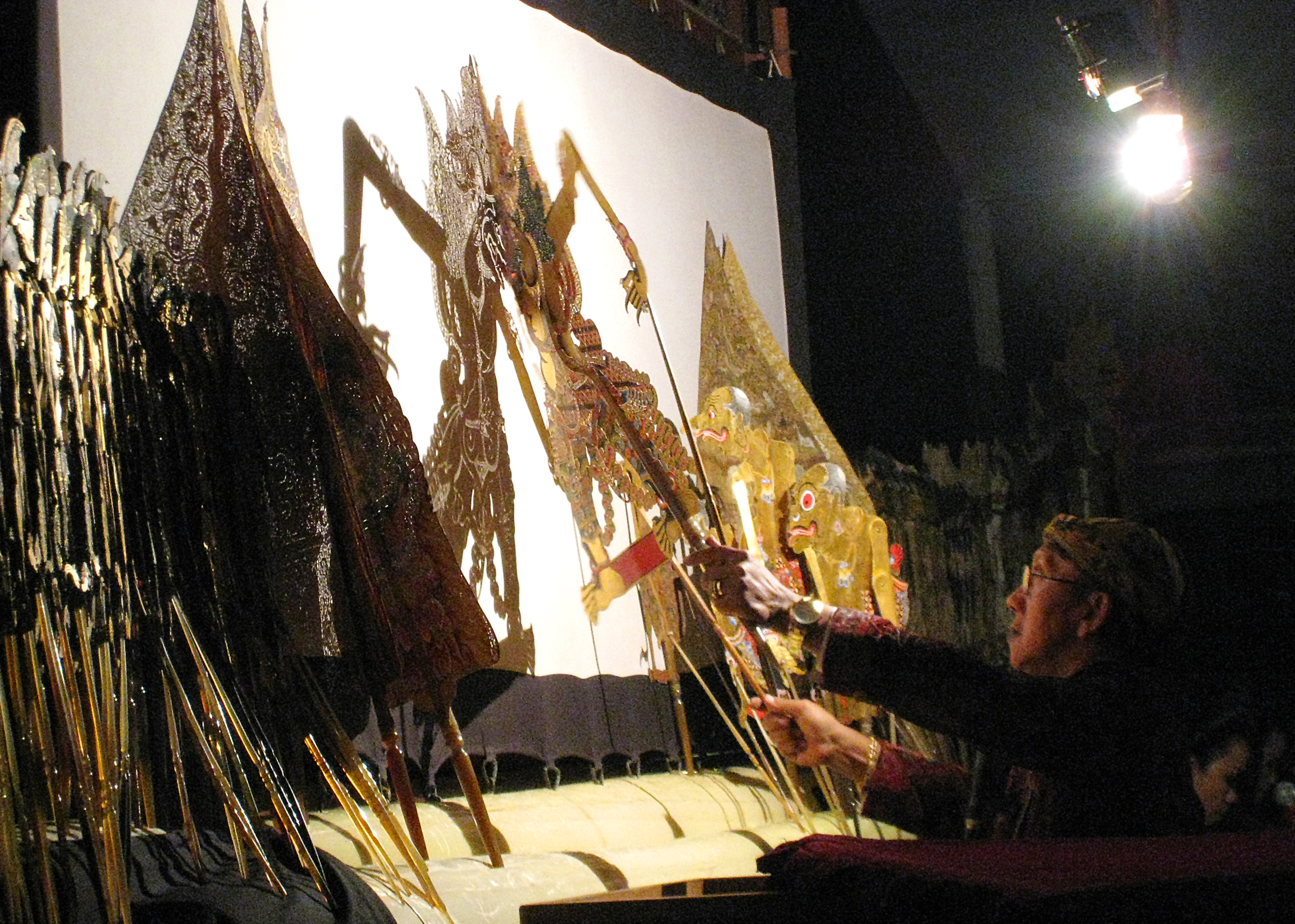
Wayang kulit performance by the famous Indonesian dalang (puppet master) Manteb Soedharsono, with the story "Gathutkaca Winisuda", in Bentara Budaya Jakarta, Indonesia, on 31 July 2010

Wayang (from Javanese ꦮꦪꦁ, wayang (in the ngoko register), ꦫꦶꦁꦒꦶꦠ꧀ (in the krama register), Balinese: ᬯᬬᬂ, Sundanese: ᮝᮚᮀ, ultimately from Old Javanese wayaṅ) is a traditional Java-origin dramatic performance in which a story is represented (by puppets, by dancers) invented by the indigenous Javans (the Javanese and Sundanese) — the Native Indonesian ethnic groups. The term wayang refers both to the show as a whole and the puppet in particular. Performances of wayang puppet theatre are accompanied by a gamelan orchestra in Java, and by gender wayang in Bali. The dramatic stories depict mythologies, such as episodes from the Hindu epics the Ramayana and the Mahabharata, as well as local adaptations of cultural legends. Traditionally, a wayang is played out in a ritualized midnight-to-dawn show by a dalang, an artist and spiritual leader; people watch the show from both sides of the screen.

Wayang performances are popular among Indonesians, especially in the islands of Java and Bali. They are usually held at certain rituals, ceremonies, events as well as tourist attractions. In ritual contexts, puppet shows are used for prayer rituals in Balinese temples, ruwatan ritual (cleansing Sukerto children from bad luck), and sedekah bumi ritual (thanksgiving to God for the abundant crops). In the context of ceremonies, usually it is used to celebrate mantenan (Javanese wedding ceremony) and sunatan (circumcision ceremony). In events, it is used to celebrate Independence Day, the anniversaries of municipalities and companies, birthdays, commemorating certain days, and many more. Even in the modern era with the development of tourism activities, wayang puppet shows are used as cultural tourism attractions.

== Etymology ==
The term wayang is the Javanese word for 'shadow' or 'imagination'. The term wayang is used in the Javanese ngoko register and its krama equivalent is ringgit. In Indonesian, it is called bayang.

In modern daily Javanese and Indonesian vocabulary, wayang can refer to the puppet itself or the whole puppet theatre performance.

== History ==
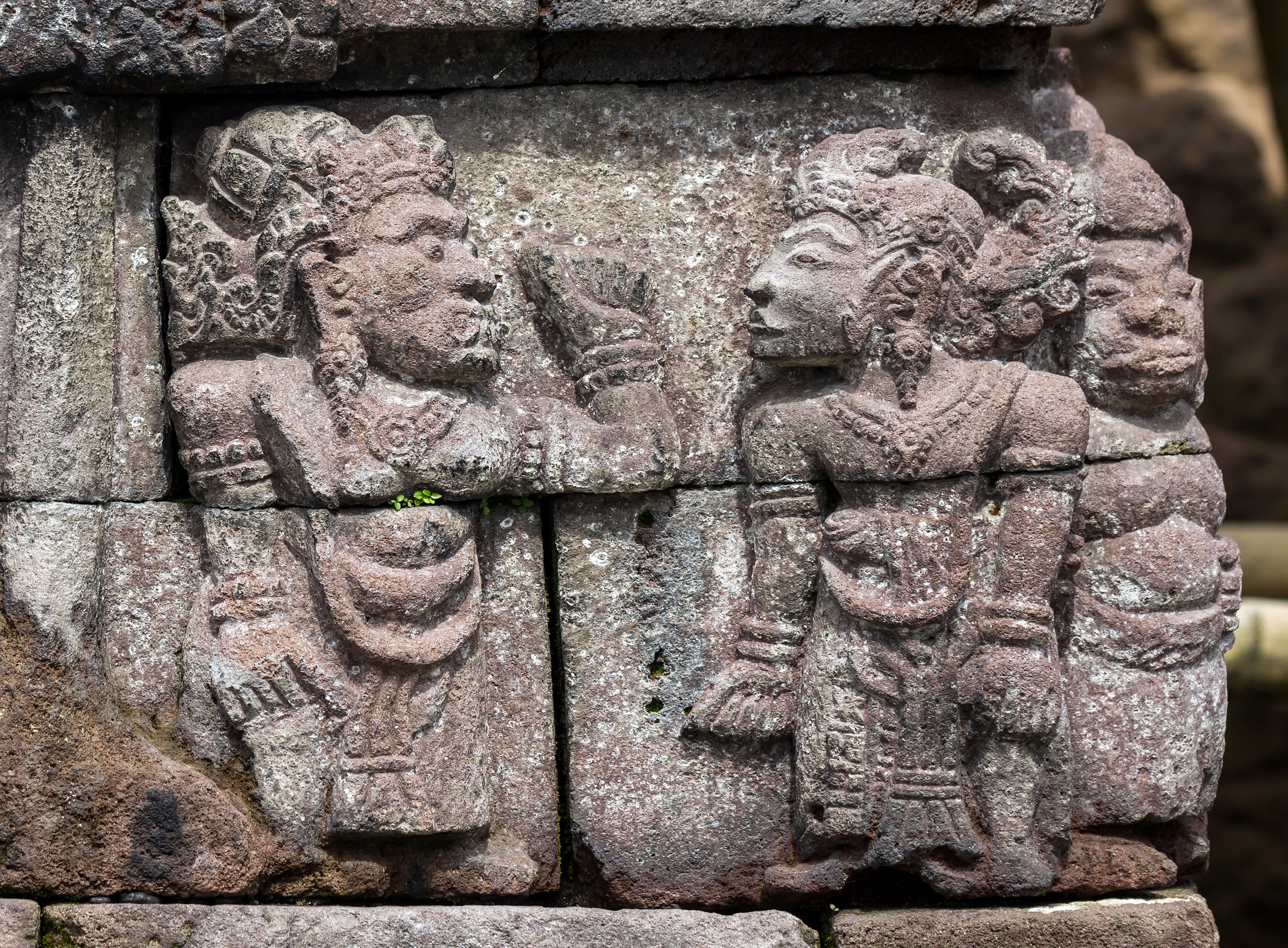
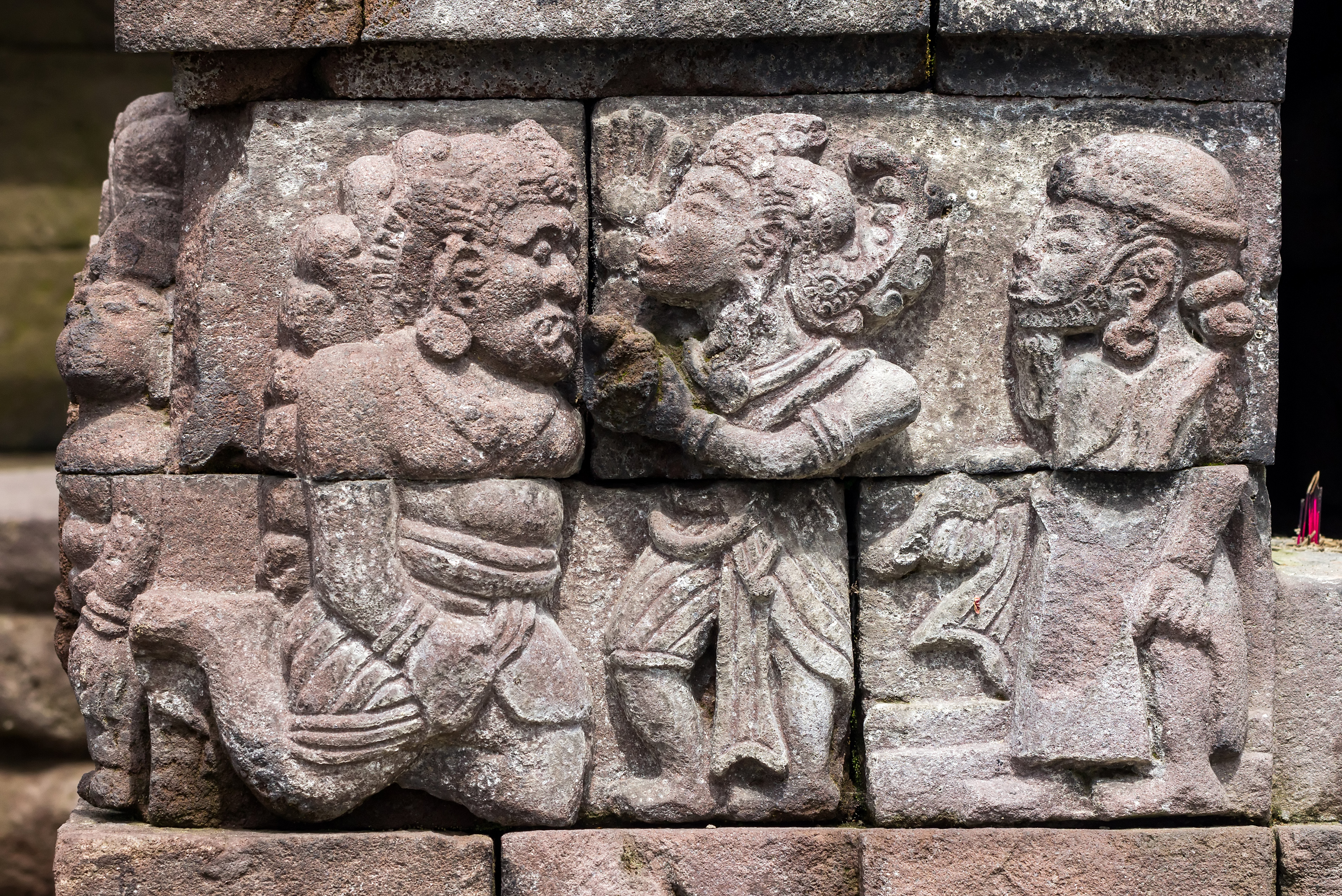
Ancient evidence of Wayang as depicted on bas-reliefs of ancient temples in Java
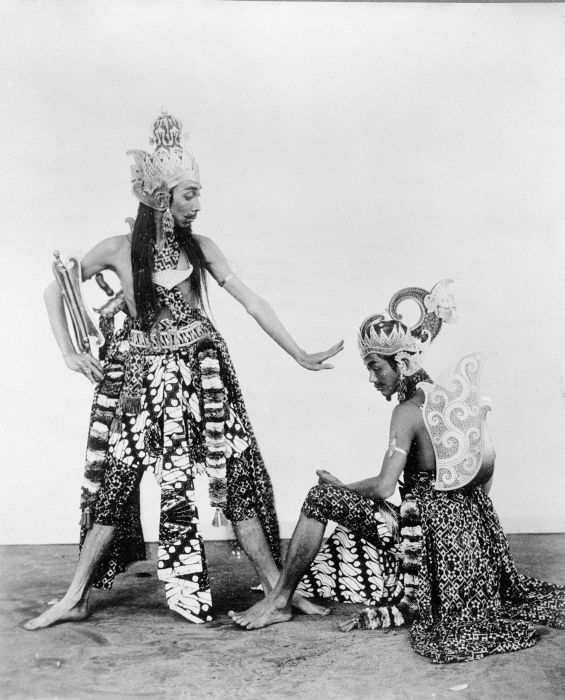
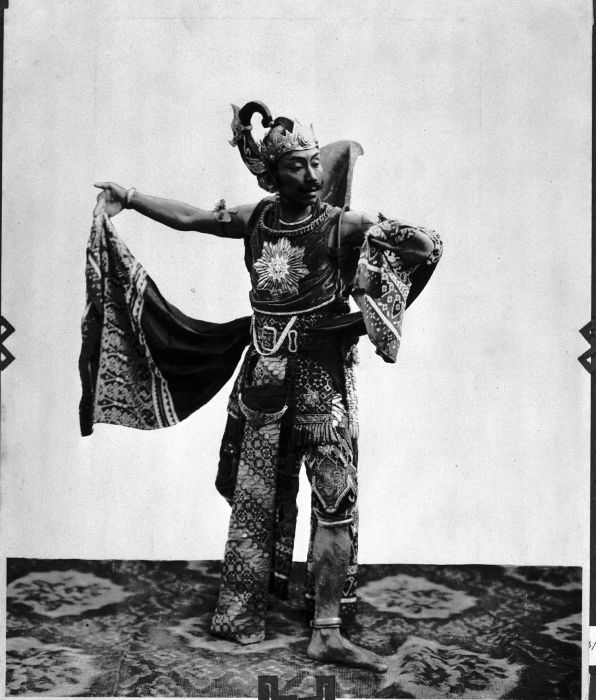
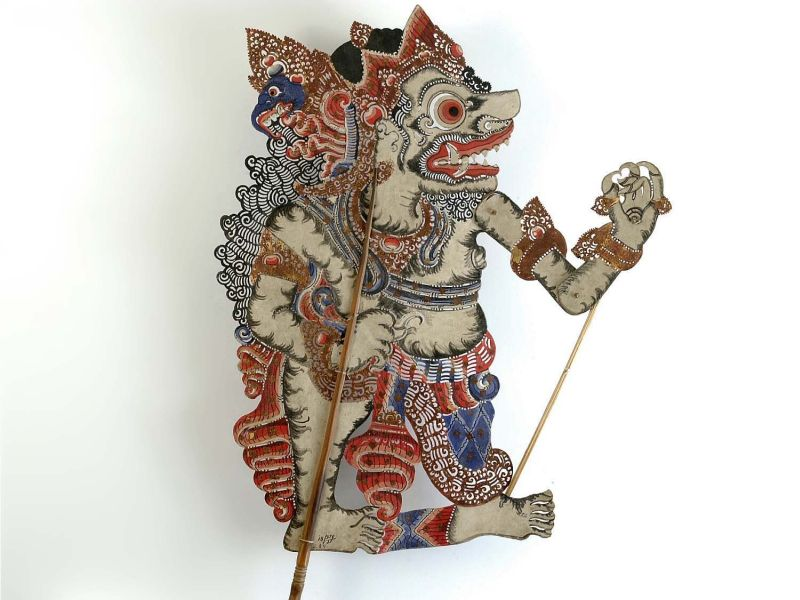
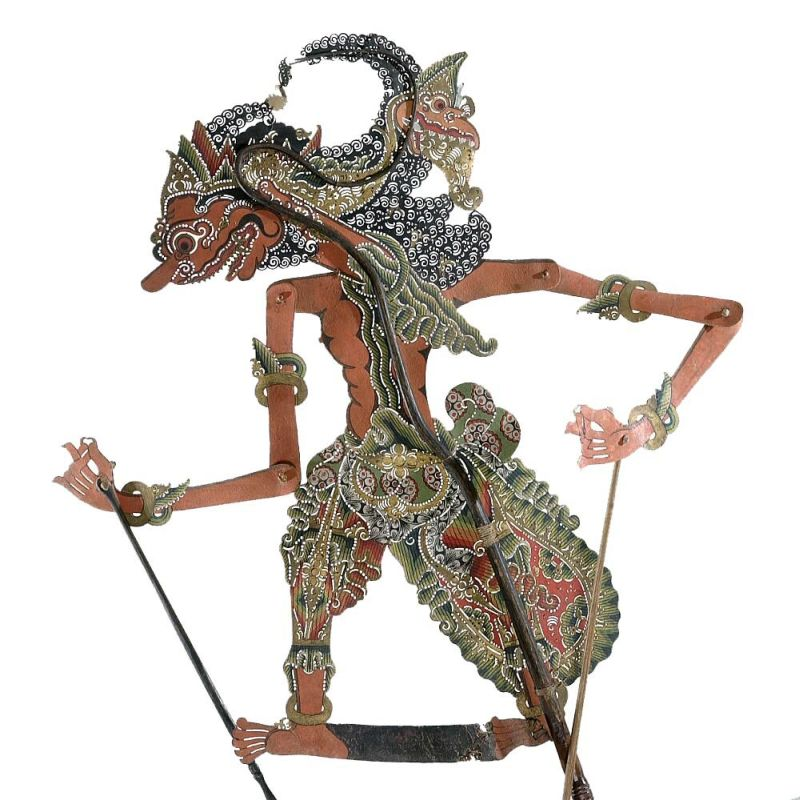

Wayang is the traditional puppet theatre of Indonesia. It is an ancient form of storytelling known for its elaborate puppets and complex musical styles. The earliest evidence of wayang comes from medieval-era texts and archeological sites dating from late 1st millennium CE.

Shadow play, the earliest form of shadow puppet theatre, likely originated in Central Asia-China or in India in the 1st millennium BCE. By at least around 200 BCE, the figures on cloth seem to have been replaced with puppetry in Telugu Indian tholu bommalata shows. These are performed behind a thin screen with flat, jointed puppets made of colorfully painted transparent leather. The puppets are held close to the screen and lit from behind, while hands and arms are manipulated with attached canes and lower legs swinging freely from the knee.

Regardless of its origins, wayang developed and matured into a Javanese phenomenon. Theater scholar James Brandon argues that there is no true contemporary puppet shadow artwork in either China or India that has the sophistication, depth, and creativity expressed in wayang in Java, Indonesia. According to Brandon, the puppets of wayang are native to Java. He states wayang is closely related to Javanese social culture and religious life, and presents parallel developments from ancient Indonesian culture, such as gamelan, the monetary system, metric forms, batik, astronomy, wet rice field agriculture, and government administration. He asserts that wayang was not derived from any other type of shadow puppetry of mainland Asia, but was an indigenous creation of the Javanese. Indian puppets differ from wayang, and all wayang technical terms are Javanese, not Sanskrit. Similarly, some of the other technical terms used in the wayang kulit found in Java and Bali are based on local languages, even when the play overlaps with Buddhist or Hindu mythologies.

G. A. J. Hazeu also says that wayang came from Java. The puppet structure, puppeteering techniques, and storytelling voices, language, and expressions are all composed according to old traditions. The technical design, the style, and the composition of the Javanese plays grew from the worship of ancestors.

J. Kats argues that the technical terms come from Java and that wayang was born without the help of India. Before the 9th century, it belonged to the Javanese. It was closely related to religious practices, such as incense and night / wandering spirits. Panakawan uses a Javanese name, different from the Indian heroes.

A. C. Kruyt argues that wayang originated from shamanism, and makes comparisons with ancient archipelago ceremonial forms which aim to contact the spirit world by presenting religious poetry praising the greatness of the soul.

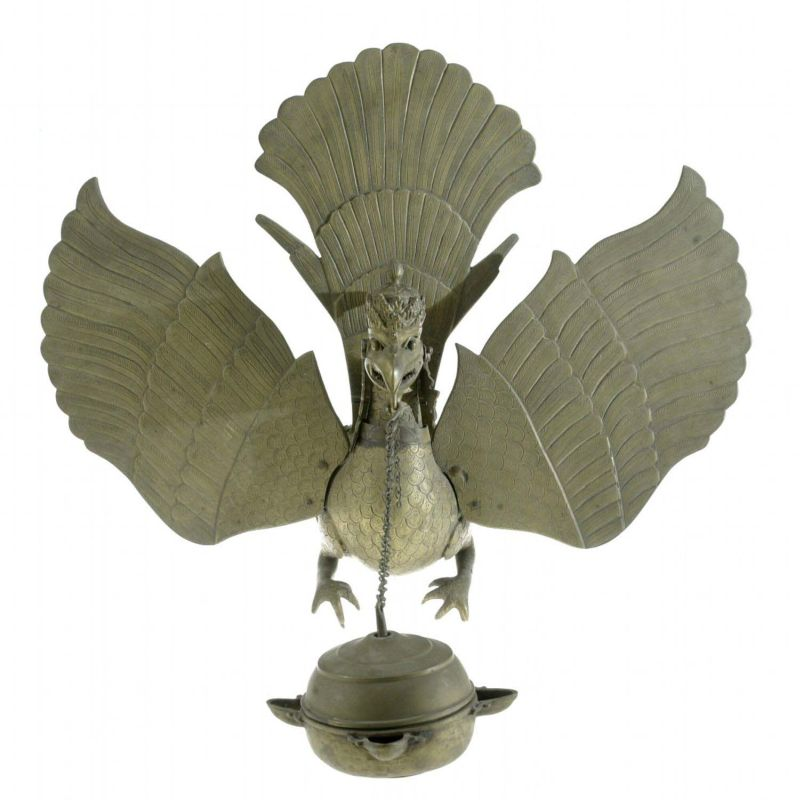
Bléncong, a Javanese oil lamp in the form of the mythical Garuda bird for wayang kulit performances, before 1924

=== Origin in India ===
Hinduism and Buddhism arrived on the Indonesian islands in the early centuries of the 1st millennium, and along with theology, the peoples of Indonesia and Indian subcontinent exchanged culture, architecture, and traded goods. Puppet arts and dramatic plays have been documented in ancient Indian texts, dated to the last centuries of the 1st millennium BCE and the early centuries of the Common Era. Further, the eastern coastal region of India (Andhra Pradesh, Odisha, and Tamil Nadu), which most interacted with Indonesian islands, has had traditions of intricate, leather-based puppet arts called tholu bommalata, tholpavakoothu, and rabana chhaya, which share many elements with wayang.

Some characters such as the Vidusaka in Sanskrit drama and Semar in wayang are very similar. Indian mythologies and characters from the Hindu epics feature in many major wayang plays, which suggests possible Indian origins, or at least an influence in the pre-Islamic period of Indonesian history. Jivan Pani states that wayang developed from two art forms from Odisha in eastern India: the Ravana Chhaya puppet theatre and the Chhau dance.

=== Records ===
The oldest known record concerning wayang is from the 10th century. In 903 CE, the Dalinan charter was issued by King Balitung of the Sanjaya dynasty of the Ancient Mataram Kingdom. It describes a wayang performance: si galigī mavayaṁ buAt thyaṁ macarita bimva ya kumāra, which means 'Galigi held a puppet show, as service to the gods, telling the story of Bima Kumara'. It seems certain features of traditional puppet theatre have survived from that time. Galigi may have been an itinerant performer who was requested to perform for a special royal occasion. At that event he performed a story about the hero Bhima from the Mahabharata.

Old Javanese inscription called Kuṭi, probably issued in the mid-10th century by Maharaja Sri Lokapala from East Java, mention three sorts of performers: atapukan (lit. 'mask dance show'), aringgit (lit. 'wayang puppet show'), and abanwal / abanol (lit. 'joke art'). Ringgit is described in an 11th-century Javanese poem as a leather shadow figure.

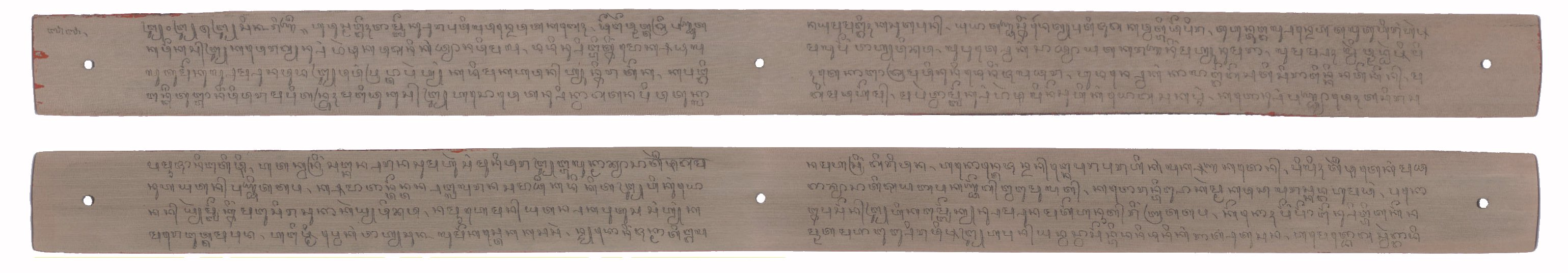
Palm leaves manuscript of kakawin Arjunawiwaha is written by Mpu Kanwa in 1035 CE

Mpu Kanwa, the poet of Airlangga's court of the Kahuripan kingdom, writes in 1035 CE in his kakawin (narrative poem) Arjunawiwaha, "santoṣâhĕlĕtan kĕlir sira sakêng sang hyang Jagatkāraṇa", which means, "He is steadfast and just a wayang screen away from the 'Mover of the World'." As kĕlir is the Javanese word for the wayang screen, the verse eloquently comparing actual life to a wayang performance where the almighty Jagatkāraṇa (the mover of the world) as the ultimate dalang (puppet master) is just a thin screen away from mortals. This reference to wayang as shadow plays suggested that wayang performance was already familiar in Airlangga's court and wayang tradition had been established in Java, perhaps even earlier. Inscriptions from this period also mention some occupations as awayang and aringgit.

Wayang puppet theatre performances in Indonesia

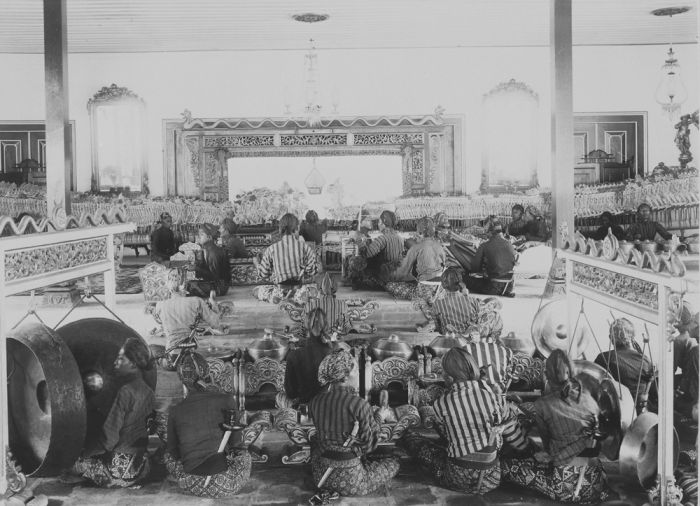
Wayang kulit performance with gamelan accompaniment in the context of the appointment of the throne for Hamengkubuwono VIII's fifteen years in Yogyakarta, between 1900 and 1940

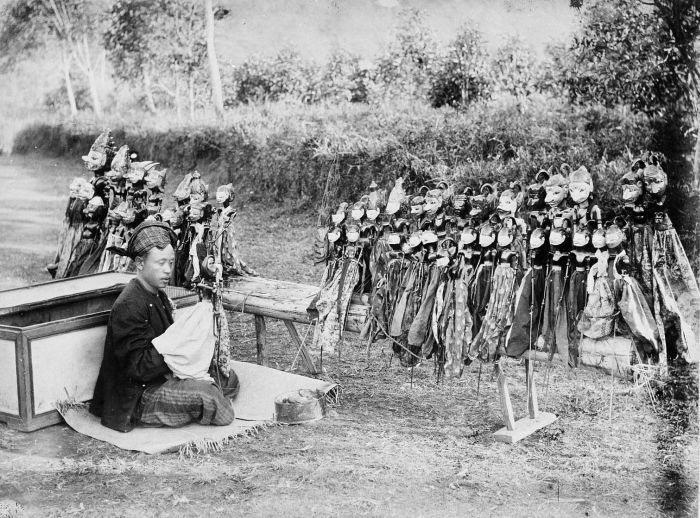
A dalang (puppeteer) in a wayang golek (wooden puppet) performance, between 1880 and 1910

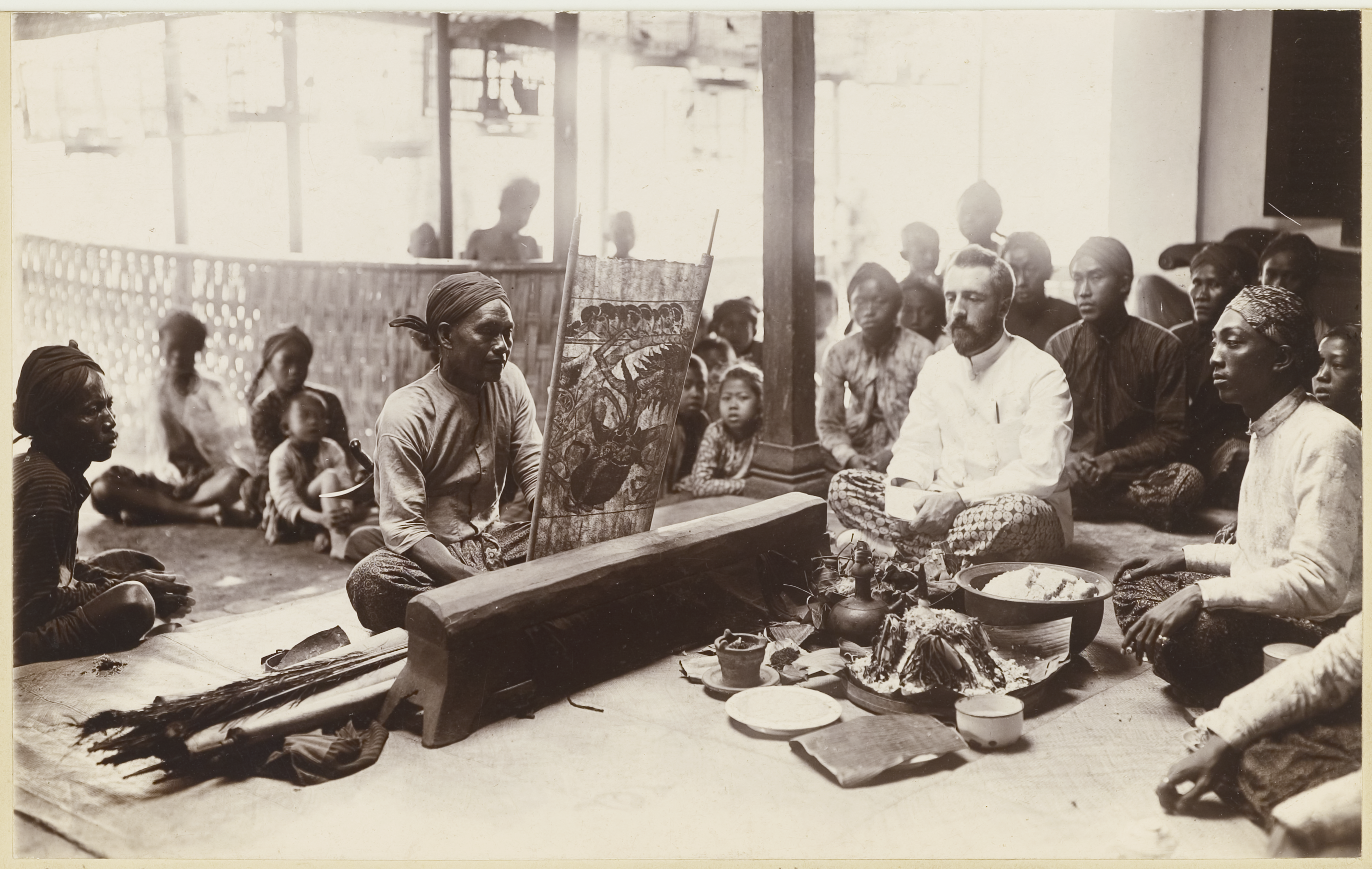
Wayang beber performance of the desa Gelaran at the home of Dr. Wahidin Soedirohoesodo at Yogyakarta; in the middle Dr. GAJ Hazeu, Dutch East Indies, in 1902

== Art form ==
=== Wayang kulit ===
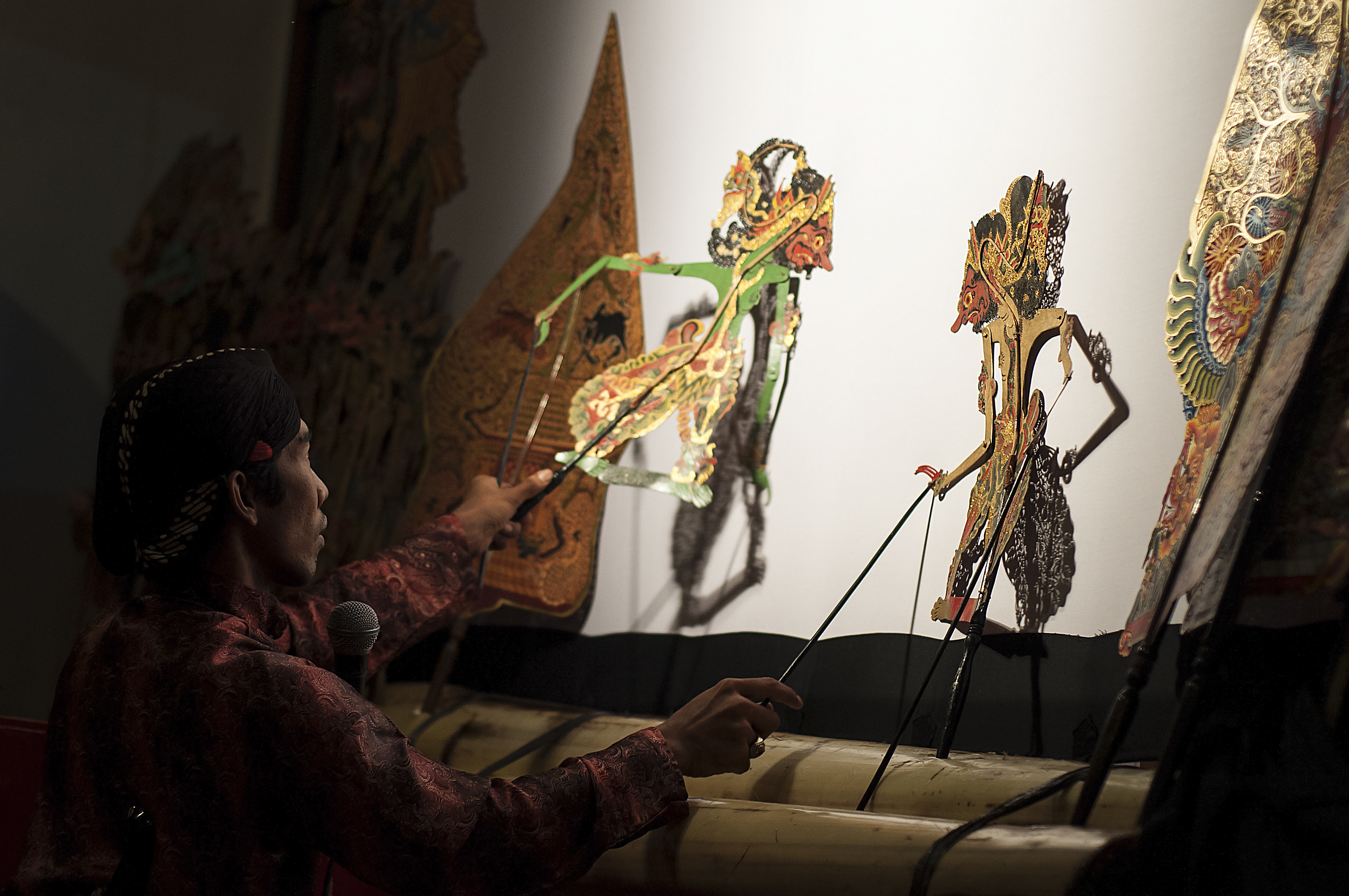
A dalang (puppet master) depicting a fight in a wayang kulit performance

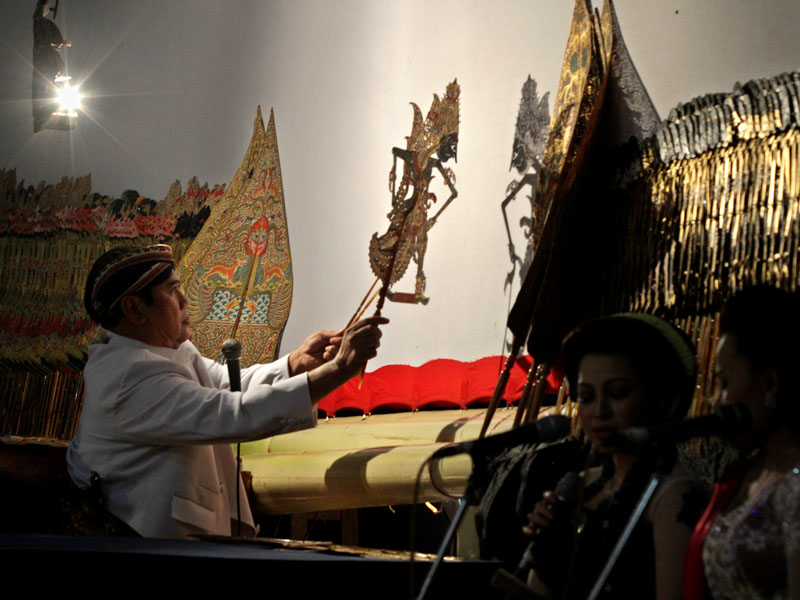
There are three main components of wayang kulit shows including dalang, gamelan (music and sindhen), and wayang kulit itself

Wayang kulit is a unique form of theatre employing light and shadow. The puppets are crafted from buffalo hide and mounted on bamboo sticks. When held up behind a piece of white cloth, with an electric bulb or an oil lamp as the light source, shadows are cast on the screen. The historically popular wayang kulit typically is based on the Hindu epics the Mahabharata and the Ramayana. Some of the plays are also based on local stories like Panji tales.

Wayang kulit are without a doubt the best known of the Indonesian wayang. Kulit means 'skin', and refers to the leather construction of the puppets that are carefully chiselled with fine tools, supported with carefully shaped buffalo horn handles and control rods, and painted in beautiful hues, including gold. The stories are usually drawn from the Hindu epics the Ramayana and the Mahabharata.

There is a family of characters in Javanese wayang called punokawan; they are sometimes referred to as "clown-servants" because they normally are associated with the story's hero, and provide humorous and philosophical interludes. Semar is actually the god of love, who has consented to live on earth to help humans. He has three sons: Gareng (the eldest), Petruk (the middle), and Bagong (the youngest). These characters did not originate in the Hindu epics, but were added later. They provide something akin to a political cabaret, dealing with gossip and contemporary affairs.

The puppet figures themselves vary from place to place. In Central Java, the city of Surakarta (Solo) and city of Yogyakarta have the best-known wayang traditions, and the most commonly imitated style of puppets. Regional styles of shadow puppets can also be found in Temanggung, West Java, Banyumas, Cirebon, Semarang, and East Java. Bali's wayang are more compact and naturalistic figures, and Lombok has figures representing real people. Often modern-world objects as bicycles, automobiles, airplanes and ships will be added for comic effect, but for the most part the traditional puppet designs have changed little in the last 300 years.

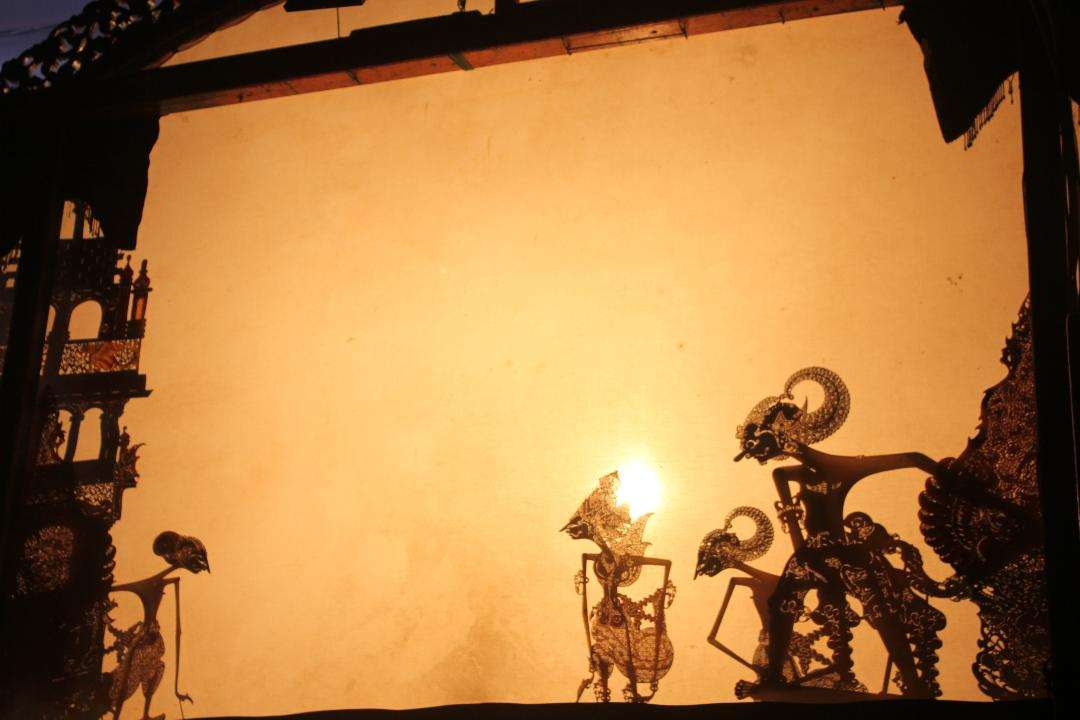
A wayang kulit (leather shadow puppet) performance using kelir (thin fabric) as a border between the puppeteer (dalang) who plays the puppets and the audience

Historically, the performance consisted of shadows cast by an oil lamp onto a cotton screen. Today, the source of light used in wayang performance in Java is most often a halogen electric light, while Bali still uses the traditional firelight. Some modern forms of wayang such as wayang sandosa (from Bahasa Indonesia, since it uses the national language of Indonesian instead of Javanese) created in the Art Academy at Surakarta (STSI) employ theatrical spotlights, colored lights, contemporary music, and other innovations.

Making a wayang kulit figure that is suitable for a performance involves hand work that takes several weeks, with the artists working together in groups. They start from master models (typically on paper) which are traced out onto skin or parchment, providing the figures with an outline and with indications of any holes that will need to be cut (such as for the mouth or eyes). The figures are then smoothed, usually with a glass bottle, and primed. The structure is inspected and eventually the details are worked through. A further smoothing follows before individual painting, which is undertaken by yet another craftsman.

Finally, the movable parts (upper arms, lower arms with hands and the associated sticks for manipulation) mounted on the body, which has a central staff by which it is held. A crew makes up to ten figures at a time, typically completing that number over the course of a week. However, there is not strong continuing demand for the top skills of wayang craftspersons and the relatively few experts still skilled at the art sometimes find it difficult to earn a satisfactory income.

The painting of less expensive puppets is handled expediently with a spray technique, using templates, and with a different person handling each color. Less expensive puppets, often sold to children during performances, are sometimes made on cardboard instead of leather.

Some examples of wayang kulit figures (leather shadow puppet)

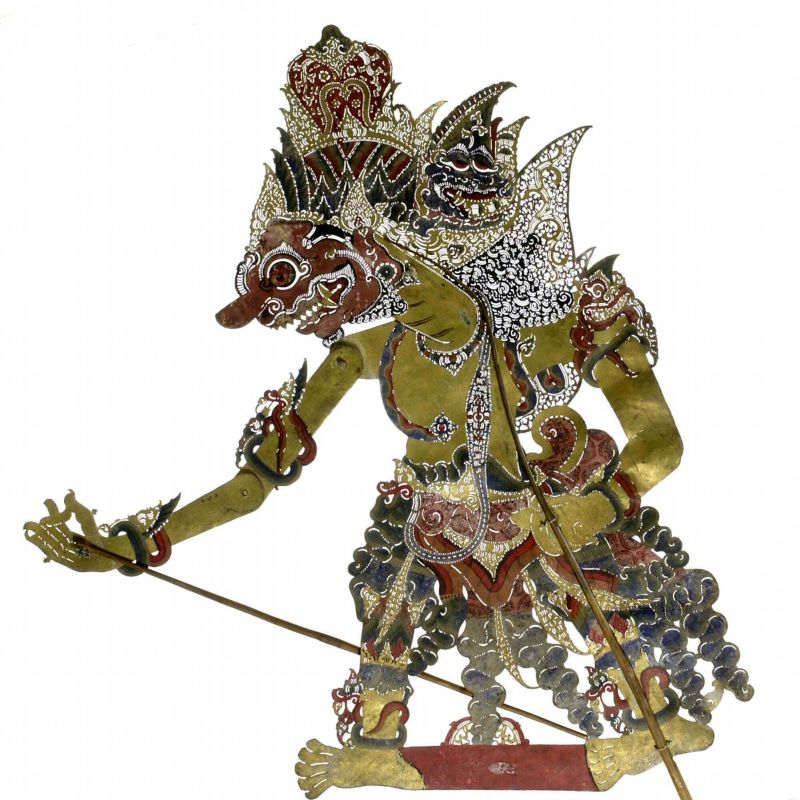
Kumbakarna, Tropenmuseum collection, Indonesia, before 1914

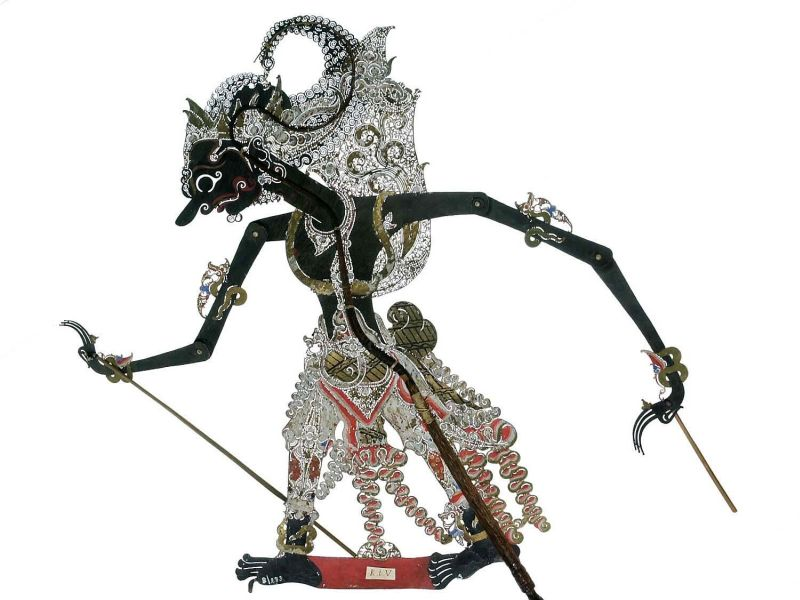
Gatot Kaca, Tropenmuseum collection, Indonesia, before 1914

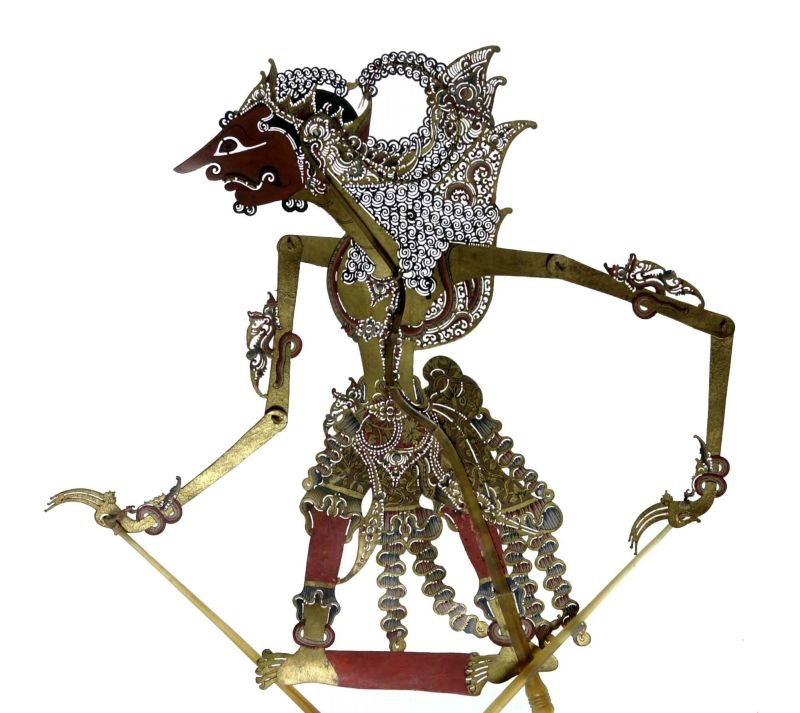
Wibisana, Tropenmuseum collection, Indonesia, before 1933

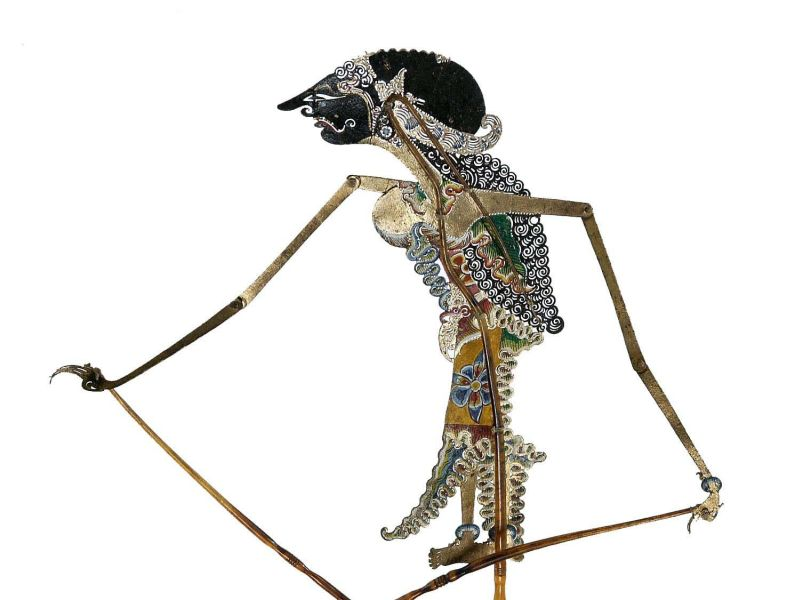
Princess Shinta, Tropenmuseum collection, Indonesia, before 1983

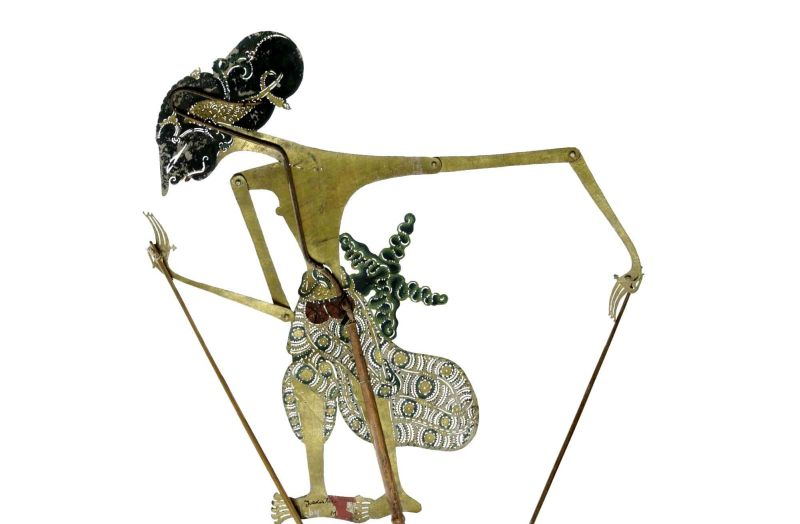
Yudhishthira, Tropenmuseum collection, Indonesia, before 1914

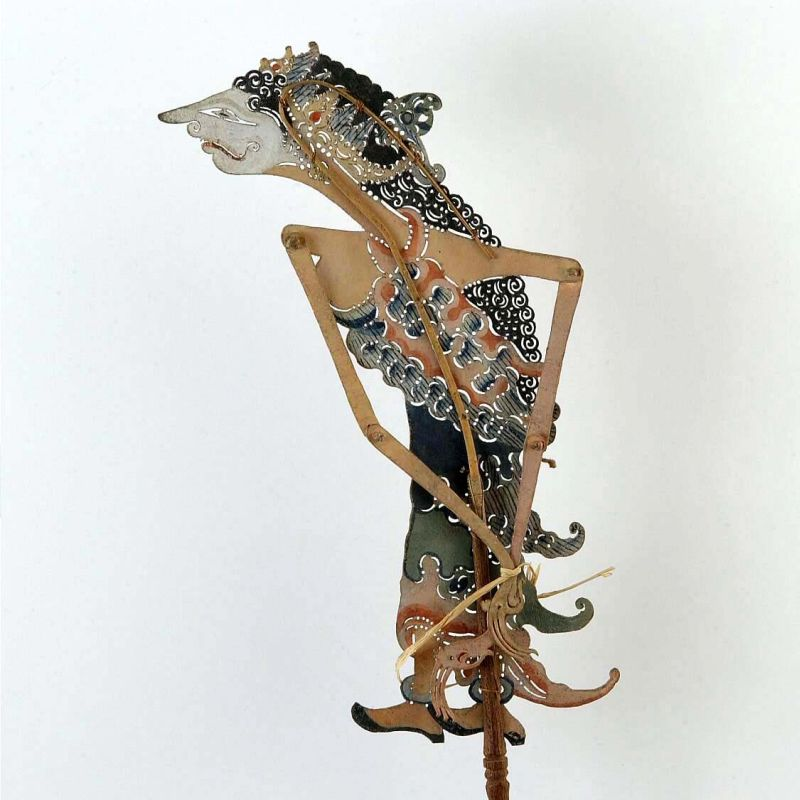
Princess Tari, Tropenmuseum collection, Indonesia, before 1934

=== Wayang golek ===
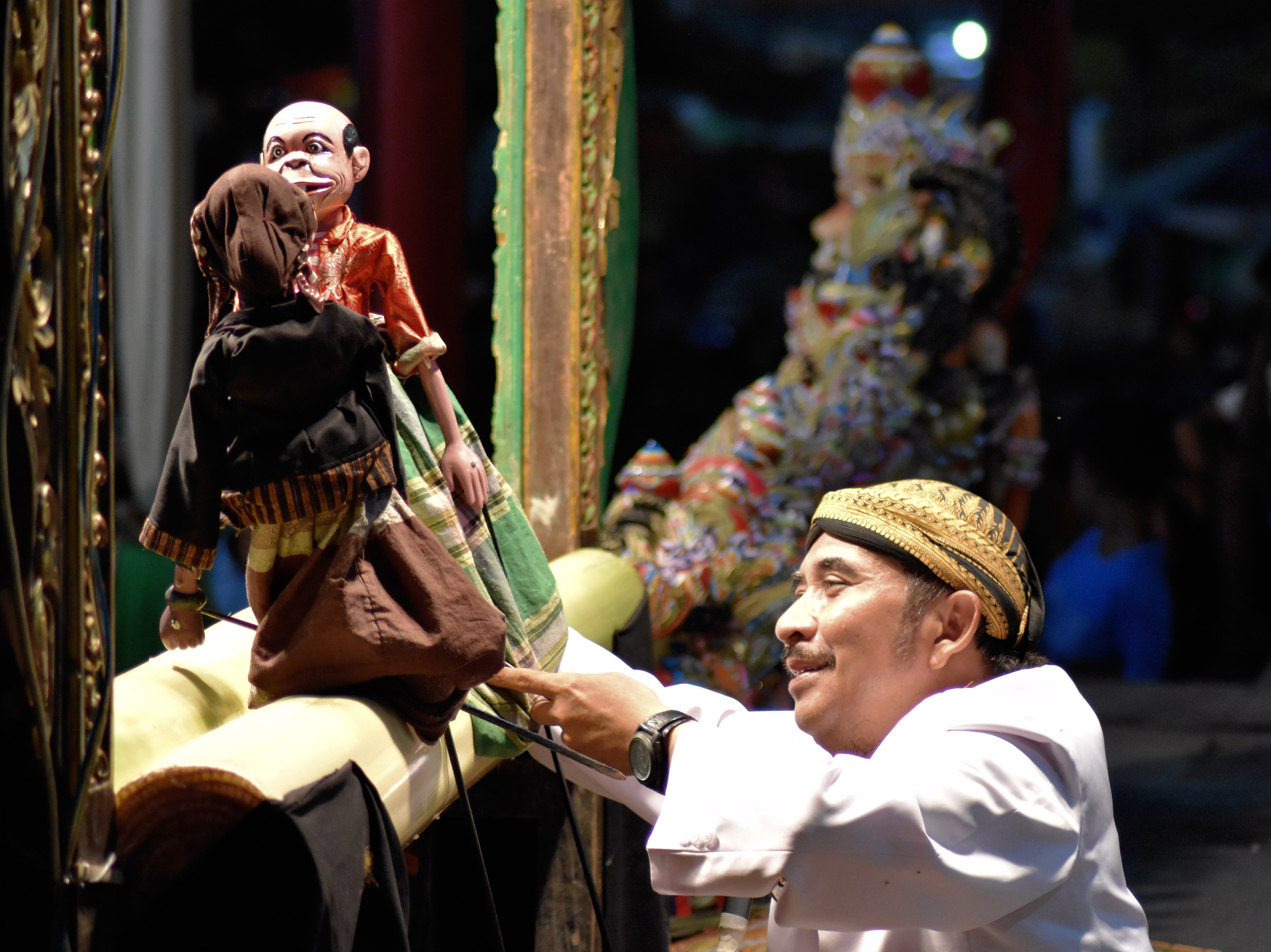
Wayang golek performance (3D wooden puppet), Indonesia

Wayang golek are three-dimensional wooden rod puppets that are operated from below by a wooden rod that runs through the body to the head, and by sticks connected to the hands. The construction of the puppets contributes to their versatility, expressiveness and aptitude for imitating human dance. wayang golek is mainly associated with the Sundanese culture of West Java. In Central Java, the wooden wayang is also known as wayang menak (Javanese: ꦮꦪꦁꦩꦺꦤꦏ꧀, romanized: wayang Ménak), which originated from Kudus, Central Java.

Little is known for certain about the history of wayang golek, but scholars have speculated that it most likely originated in China and arrived in Java sometime in the 17th century. Some of the oldest traditions of wayang golek are from the north coast of Java in what is called the Pasisir region. This is home to some of the oldest Muslim kingdoms in Java and it is likely that the wayang golek grew in popularity through telling the wayang menak stories of Amir Hamza, the uncle of Muhammad. These stories are still widely performed in Kabumen, Tegal, and Jepara as wayang golek menak, and in Cirebon, wayang golek cepak. Legends about the origins of the wayang golek attribute their invention to the Muslim saint Wali Sunan Kudus, who used the medium to proselytize Muslim values.

In the 18th century, the tradition moved into the mountainous region of Priangan, West Java, where it eventually was used to tell stories of the Ramayana and the Mahabharata in a tradition now called wayang golek purwa, which can be found in Bandung, Bogor and Jakarta. The adoption of Javanese Mataram kejawen culture by Sundanese aristocrats was probably the remnant of Mataram influence over the Priangan region during the expansive reign of Sultan Agung. While the main characters from the Ramayana and Mahabharata are similar to wayang kulit purwa versions from Central Java, some punakawan (servants or jesters) were rendered in Sundanese names and characteristics, such as Cepot or Astrajingga as Bagong, and Dawala or Udel as Petruk. Wayang golek purwa has become the most popular form of wayang golek today.

Some examples of wayang golek figures (3D wooden puppet)

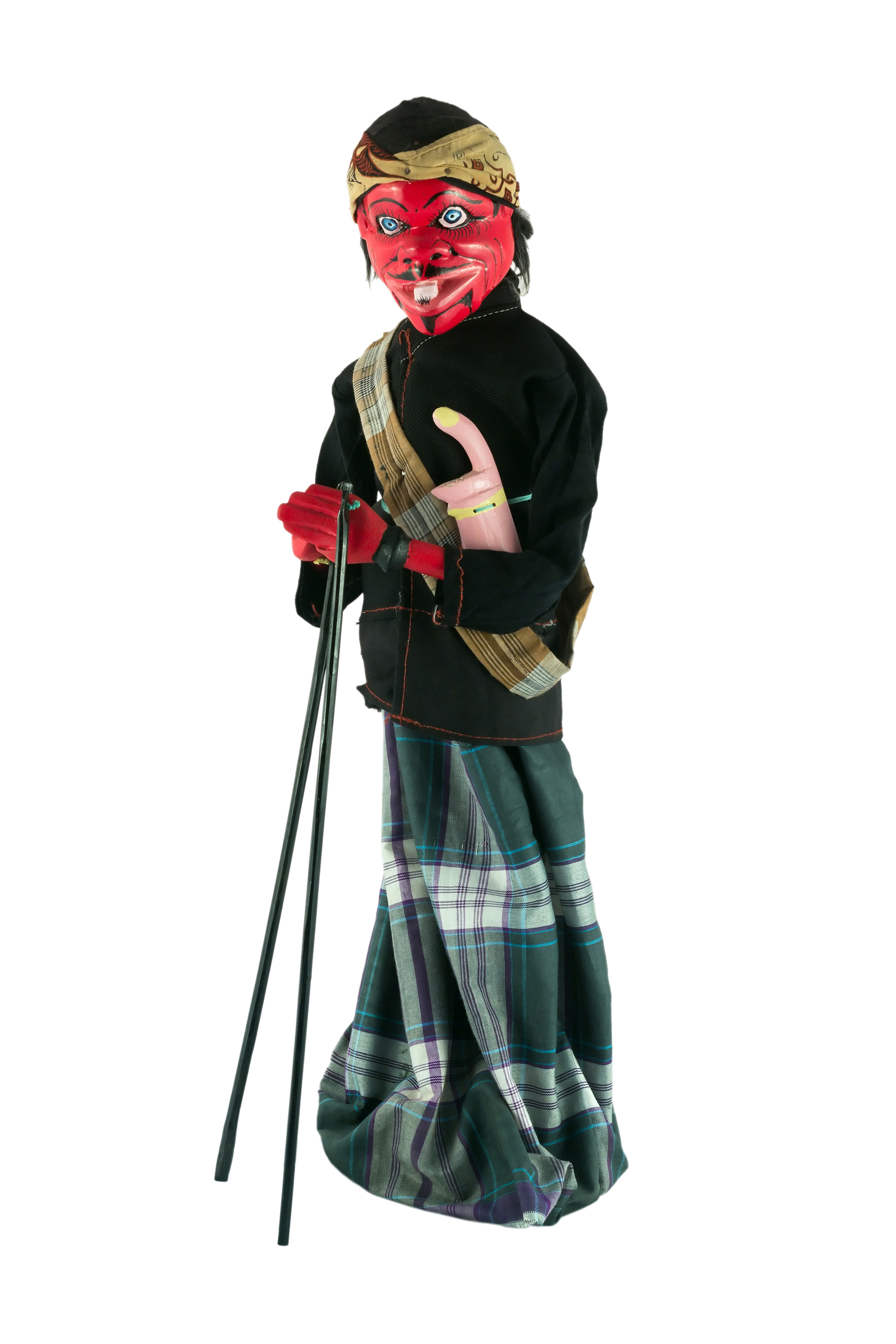
Cepot, a Sundanese Punokawan, Indonesia

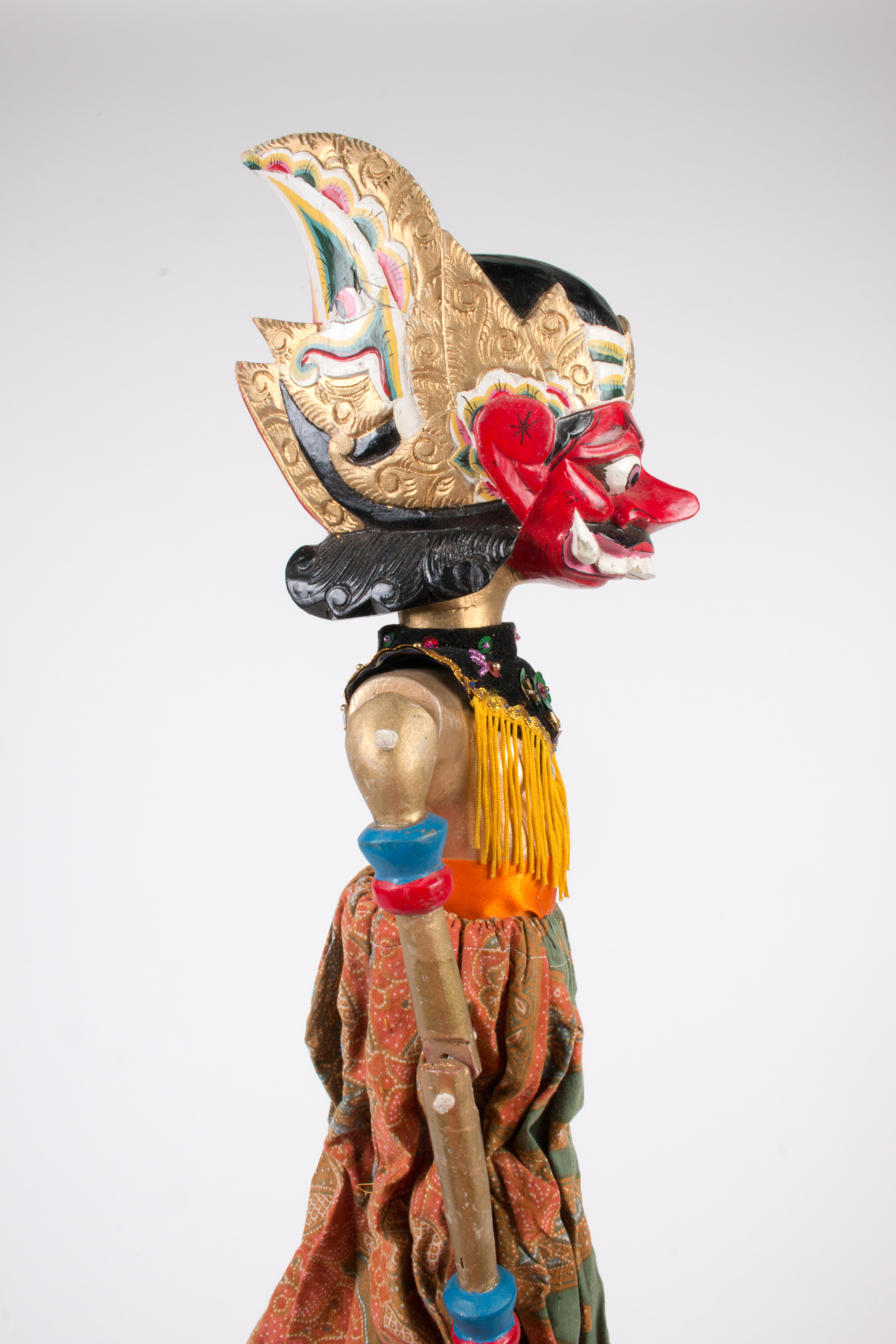
Rahwana, Indonesia in 2004

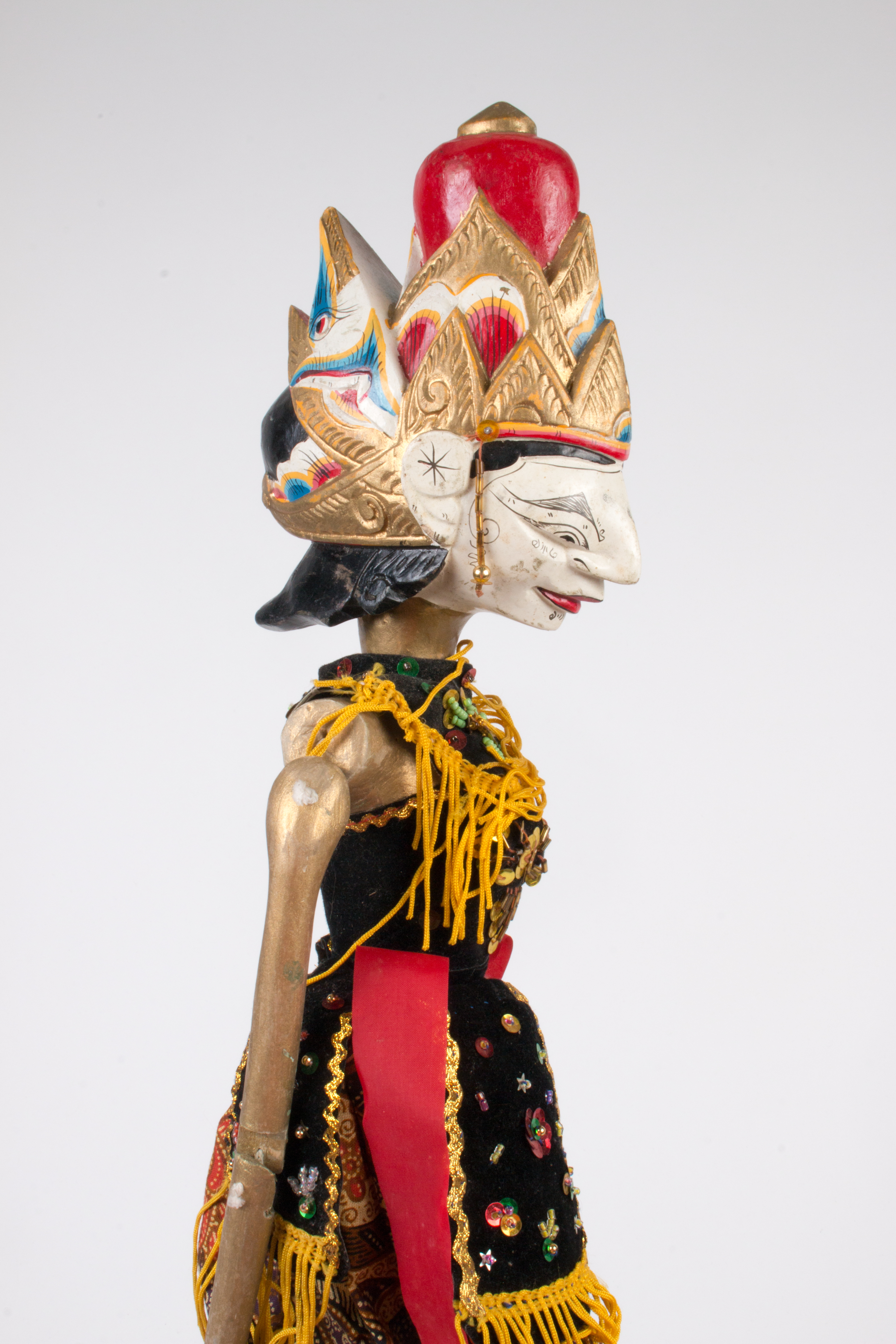
Ramawijaya, Indonesia in 2004

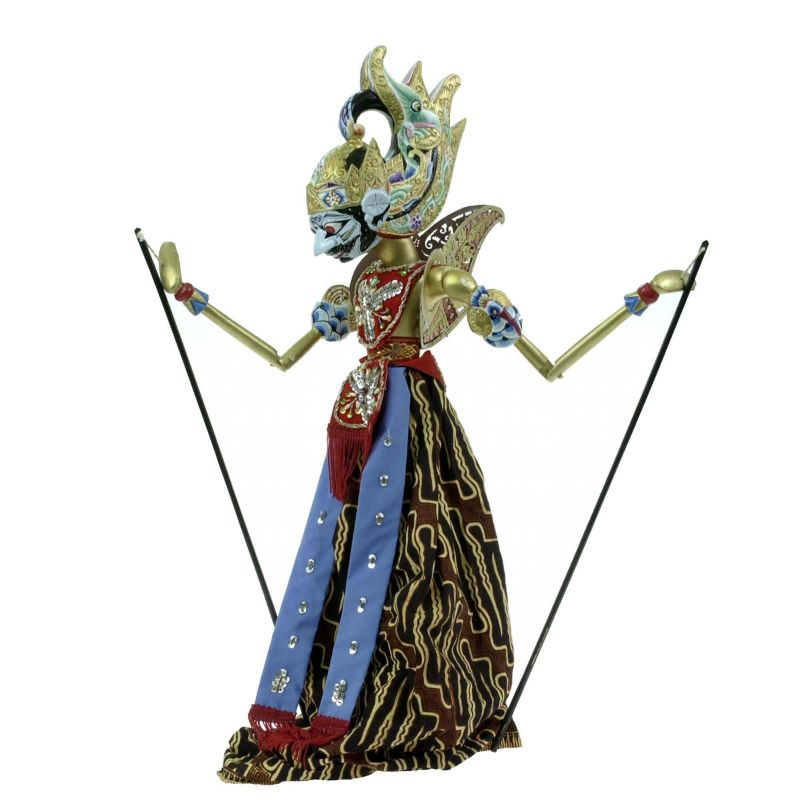
Gatot kaca, Indonesia in 2015

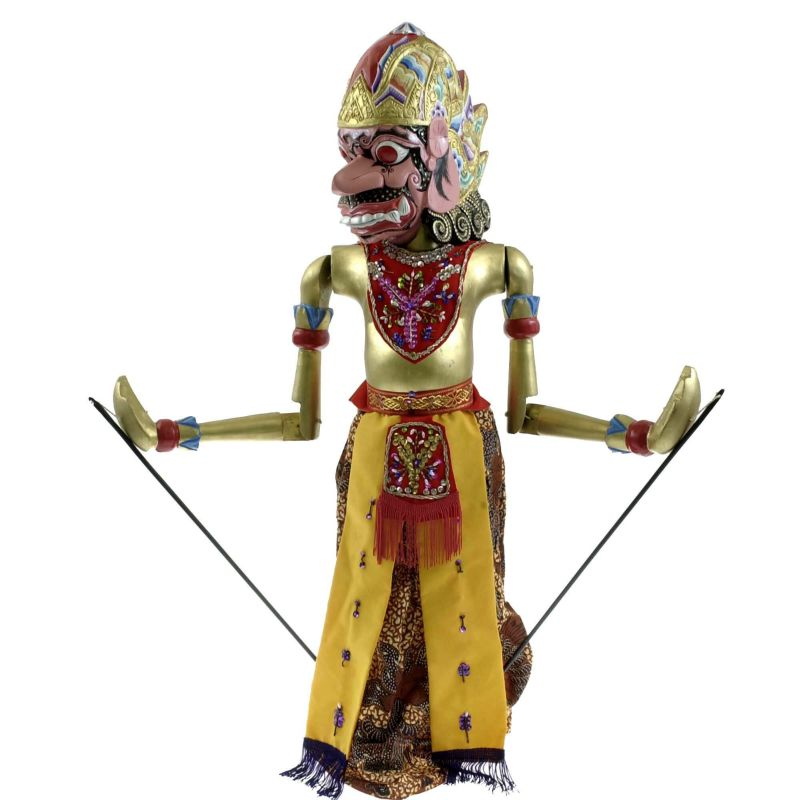
Kumbakarna, Indonesia before 1976

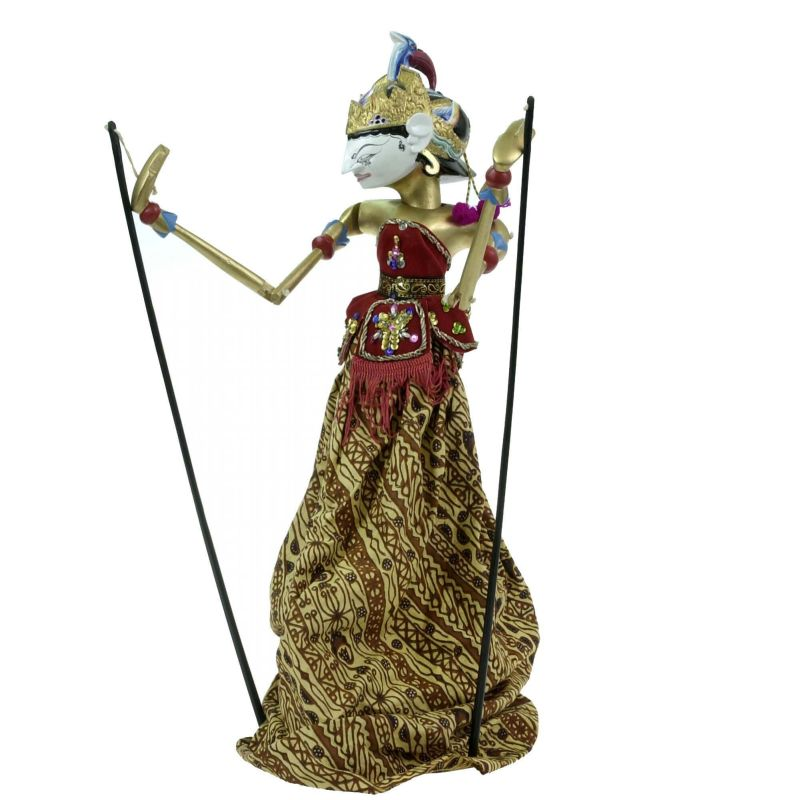
Dewi Drupadi, Indonesia before 1976

=== Wayang klitik ===
Wayang klitik (Javanese: ꦮꦪꦁꦏ꧀ꦭꦶꦛꦶꦏ꧀, romanized: wayang klithik) or wayang krucil (ꦮꦪꦁꦏꦿꦸꦕꦶꦭ꧀) figures occupy a middle ground between the figures of wayang golek and wayang kulit. They are constructed similarly to wayang kulit figures, but from thin pieces of wood instead of leather, and, like wayang kulit figures, are used as shadow puppets. A further similarity is that they are the same smaller size as wayang kulit figures. However, wood is more subject to breakage than leather. During battle scenes, wayang klitik figures often sustain considerable damage, much to the amusement of the public, but in a country in which before 1970 there were no adequate glues available, breakage generally meant an expensive, newly made figure. On this basis the wayang klitik figures, which are to appear in plays where they have to endure battle scenes, have leather arms. The name of these figures is onomotopaeic, from the sound klithik (ꦏ꧀ꦭꦶꦛꦶꦏ) that these figures make when worked by the dalang.

Wayang klitik figures come originally from eastern Java, where one still finds workshops turning them out. They are less costly to produce than wayang kulit figures.

The origin of the stories involved in these puppet plays comes from the kingdoms of eastern Java: Jenggala, Kediri and Majapahit. From Jenggala and Kediri come the stories of Raden Panji and Cindelaras, which tells of the adventures of a pair of village youngsters with their fighting cocks. The Damarwulan presents the stories of a hero from Majapahit. Damarwulan is a clever chap, who with courage, aptitude, intelligence and the assistance of his young lover Anjasmara makes a surprise attack on the neighboring kingdom and brings down Minakjinggo, an Adipati (viceroy) of Blambangan and mighty enemy of Majapahit's beautiful queen Sri Ratu Kencanawungu. As a reward, Damarwulan is married to Kencanawungu and becomes king of Majapahit; he also takes Lady Anjasmara as a second wife. This story is full of love affairs and battles and is very popular with the public. The dalang is liable to incorporate the latest local gossip and quarrels and work them into the play as comedy.

Some examples of wayang klitik figures (flat wooden puppet)

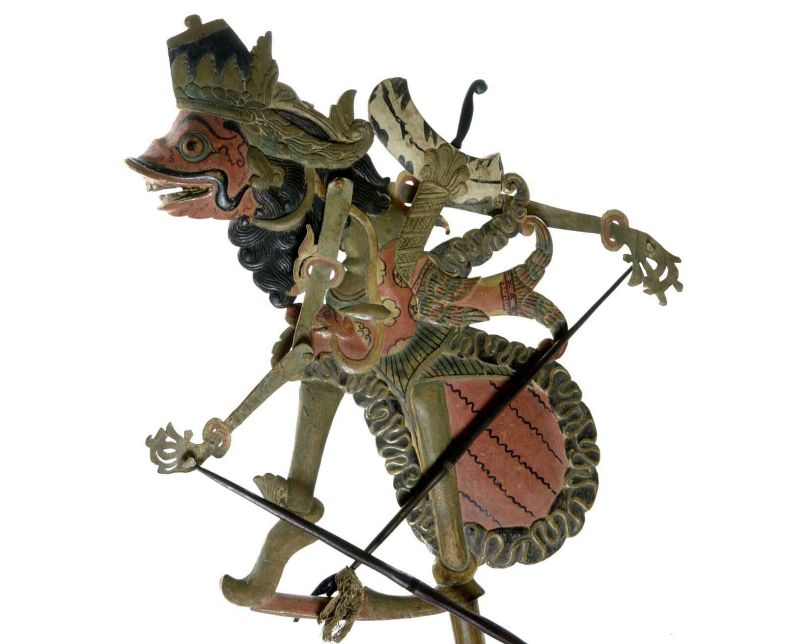
Menak Jingga, Tropenmuseum collection, Indonesia, before 1953

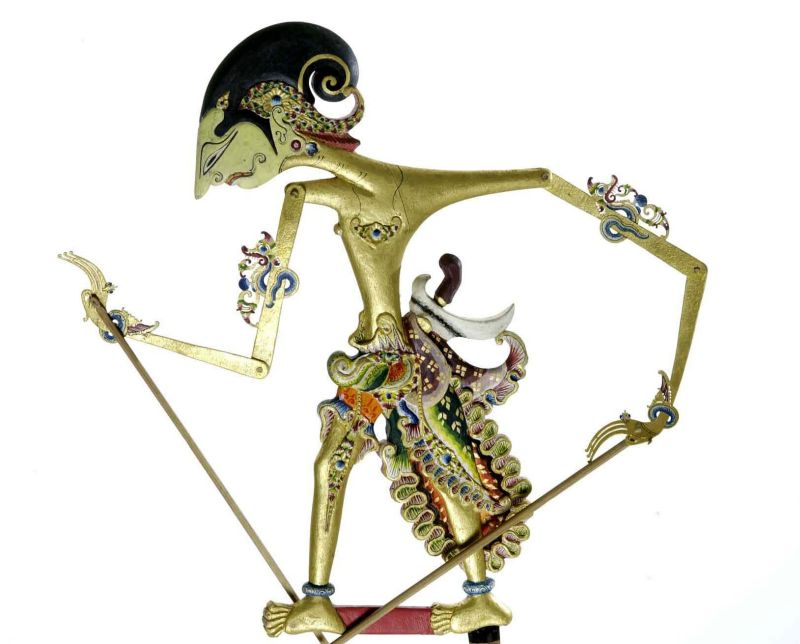
Damar Wulan, Tropenmuseum collection, Indonesia, before 1933

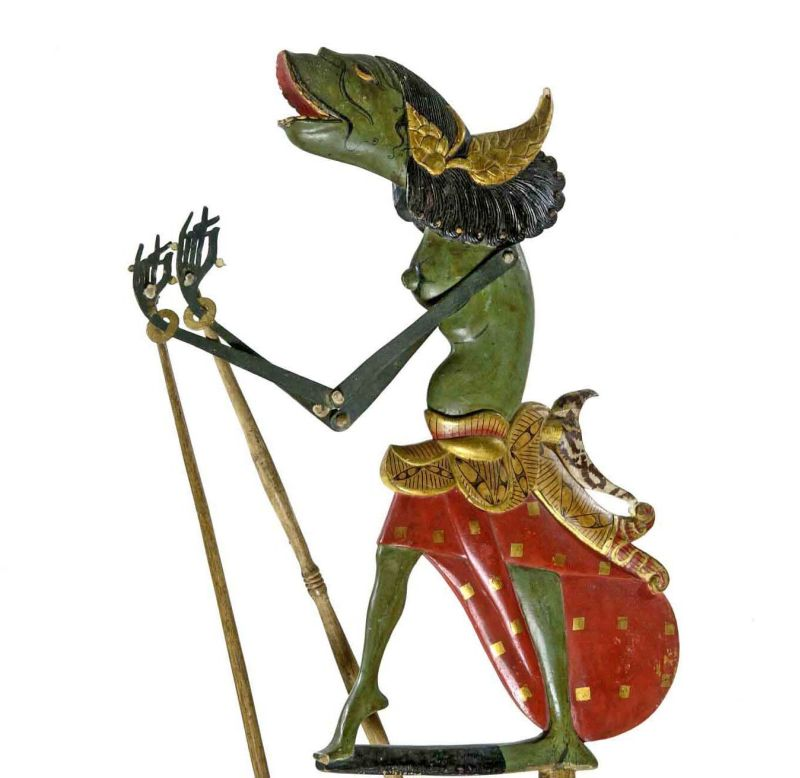
Demon, Tropenmuseum collection, Indonesia, before 1950

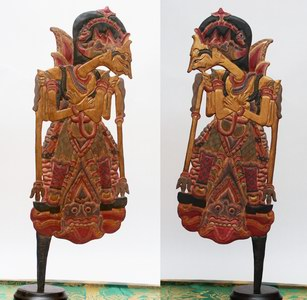
Figure of Batara Guru

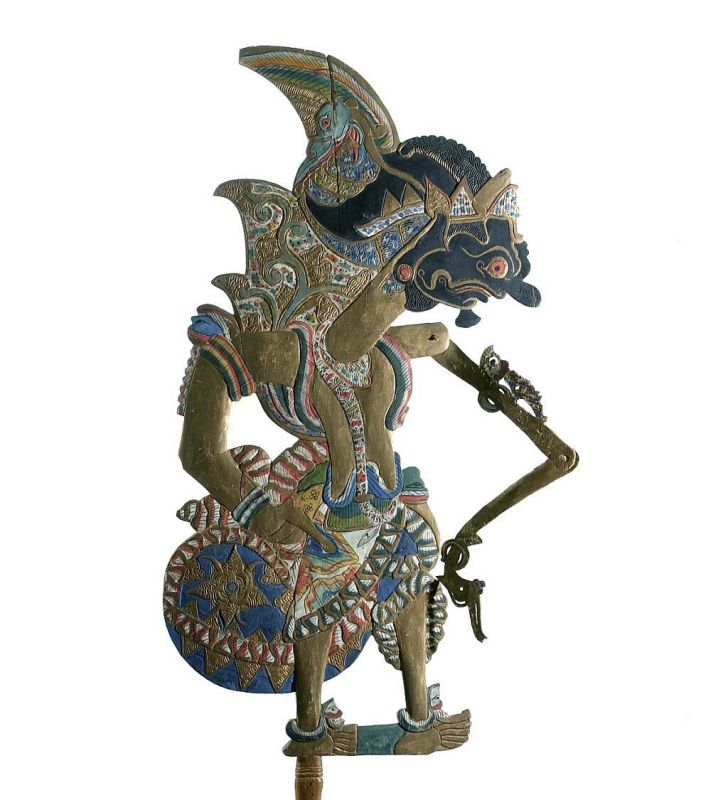
Duryudhana, Tropenmuseum collection, Indonesia, before 1986

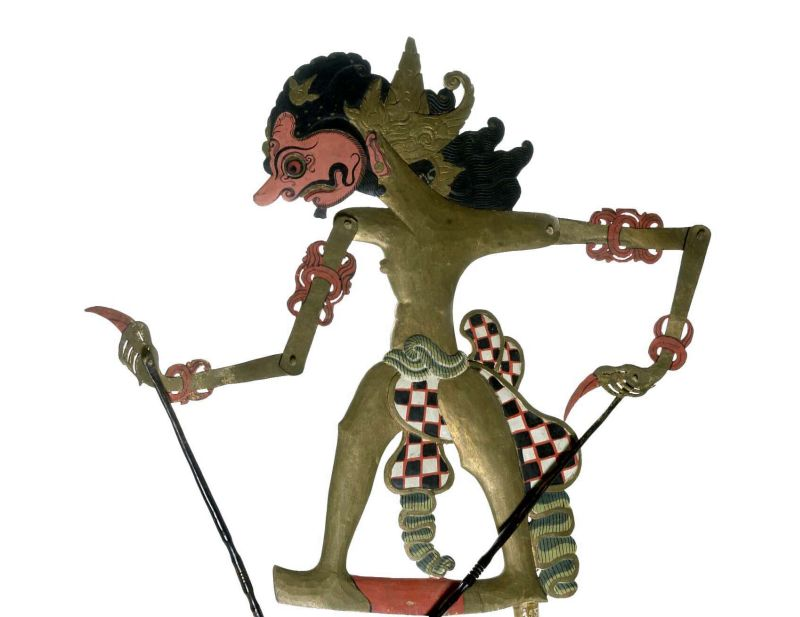
Brathasena, Tropenmuseum collection, Indonesia, before 1986

=== Wayang beber ===
Wayang beber relies on scroll-painted presentations of the stories being told. Wayang beber has strong similarities to narratives in the form of illustrated ballads that were common at annual fairs in medieval and early modern Europe. They have also been subject to the same fate—they have nearly vanished, although there are still some groups of artists who support wayang beber in places such as Surakarta (Solo) in Central Java. Chinese visitors to Java during the 15th century described a storyteller who unrolled scrolls and told stories that made the audience laugh or cry. A few scrolls of images remain from those times, found today in museums. There are two sets, hand-painted on hand-made bark cloth, that are still owned by families who have inherited them from many generations ago, in Pacitan and Wonogiri, both villages in Central Java. Performances, mostly in small open-sided pavilions or auditoriums, take place according to the following pattern:

The dalang gives a sign, the small gamelan orchestra with drummer and a few knobbed gongs and a musician with a rebab (a violin-like instrument held vertically) begins to play, and the dalang unrolls the first scroll of the story. Then, speaking and singing, he narrates the episode in more detail. In this manner, in the course of the evening he unrolls several scrolls one at a time. Each scene in the scrolls represents a story or part of a story. The content of the story typically stems from the Panji romances which are semi-historical legends set in the 12th–13th century East Javanese kingdoms of Jenggala, Daha and Kediri, and also in Bali.

Some examples of wayang beber scenes

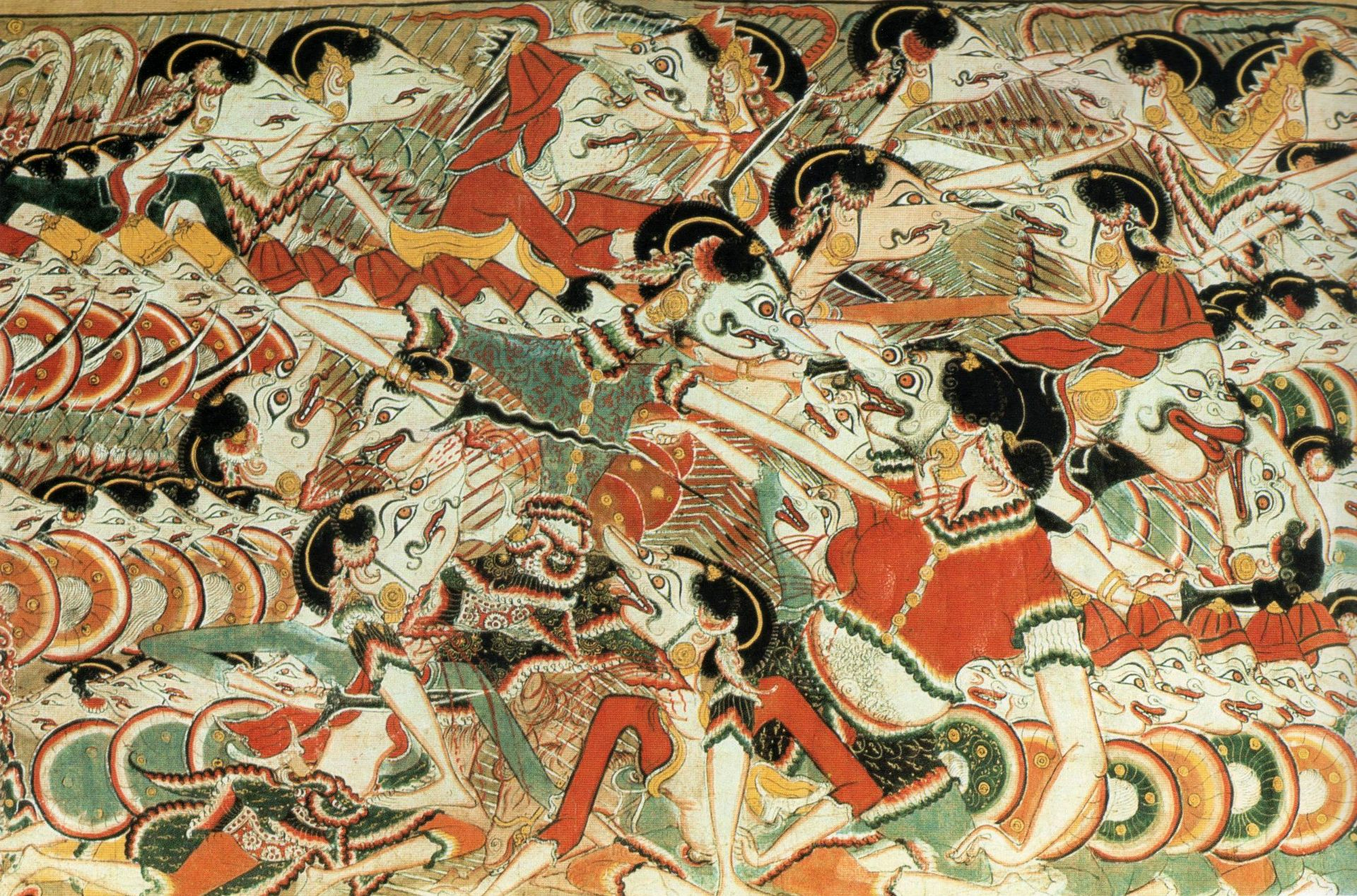
Final fight in alun-alun in Kediri, East Java. Tawang Alun kills Klana. Indonesia 17th century

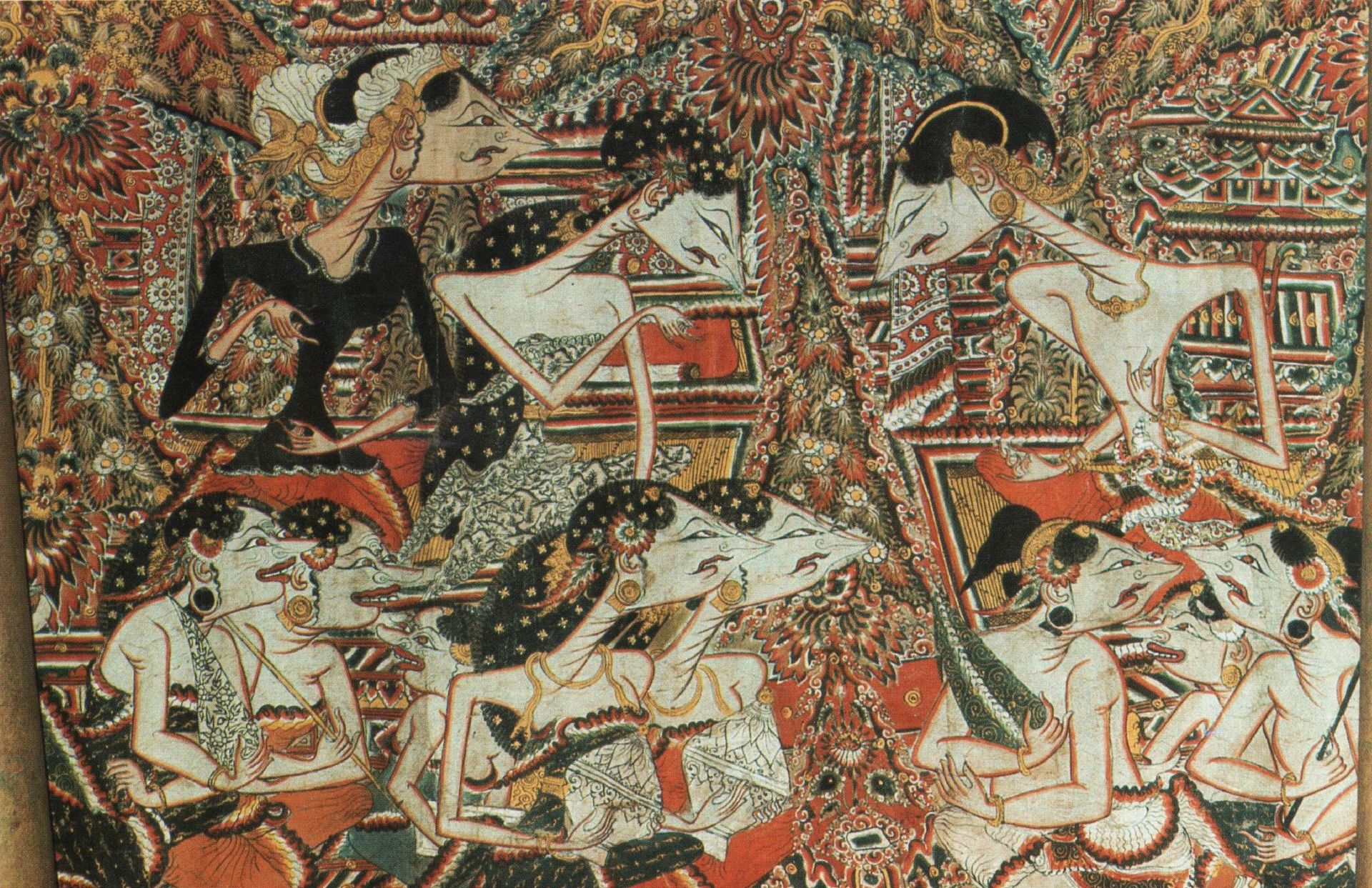
Princess Sekar Taji, mbok Kili (left), and Ganda Ripa or Panji (right) in the palace in Kediri, 17th century

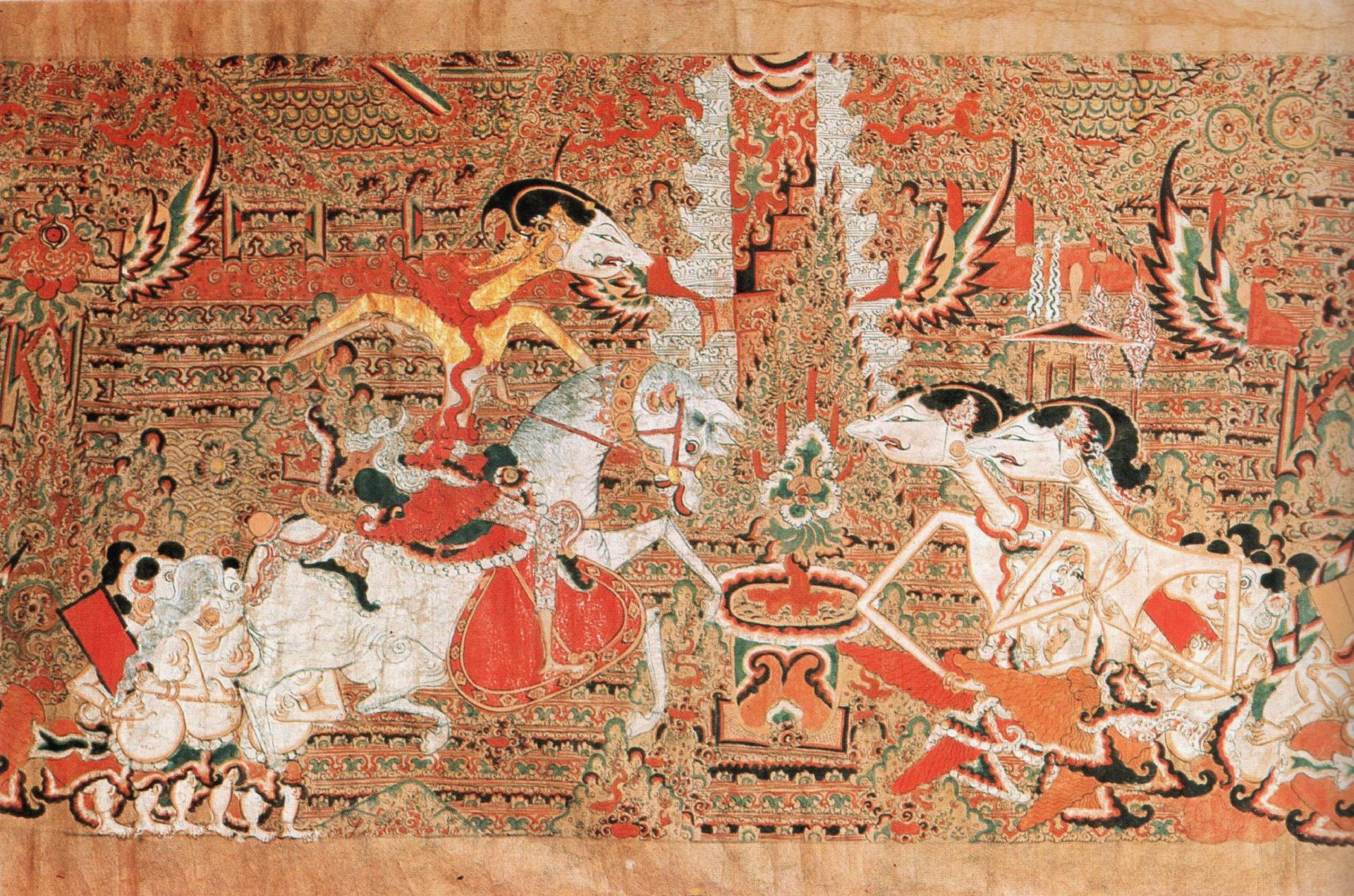
Radèn Gunung Sari on horse says goodbye to his advisers Tratag and Gimeng before travelling to princess Kumuda Ningrat, 18th century

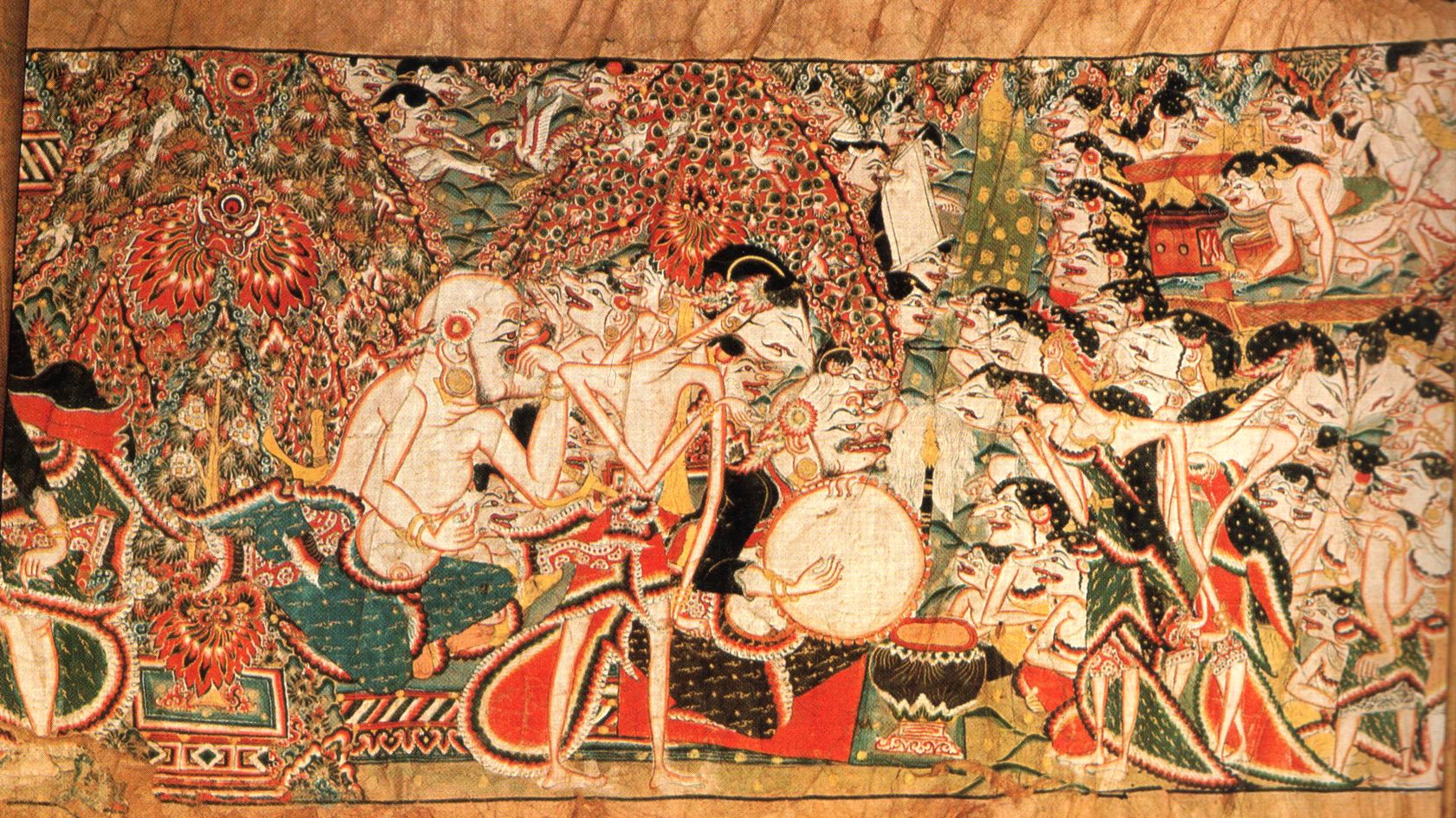
Princess Sekar Taji and Panji meet in Paluhamba market, 17th century

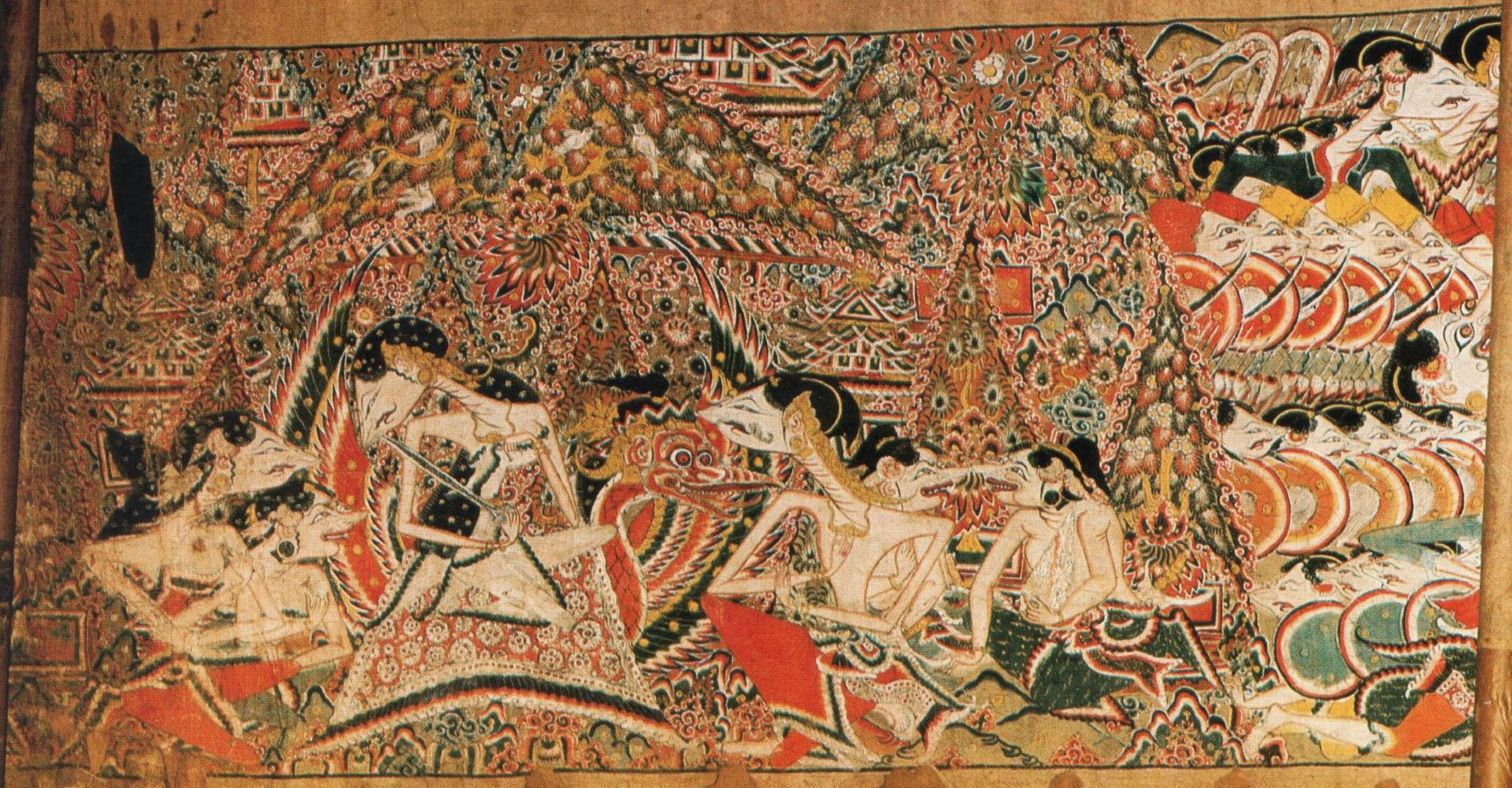
Princess Sekar Taji in palace garden approached by Klana, 17th century

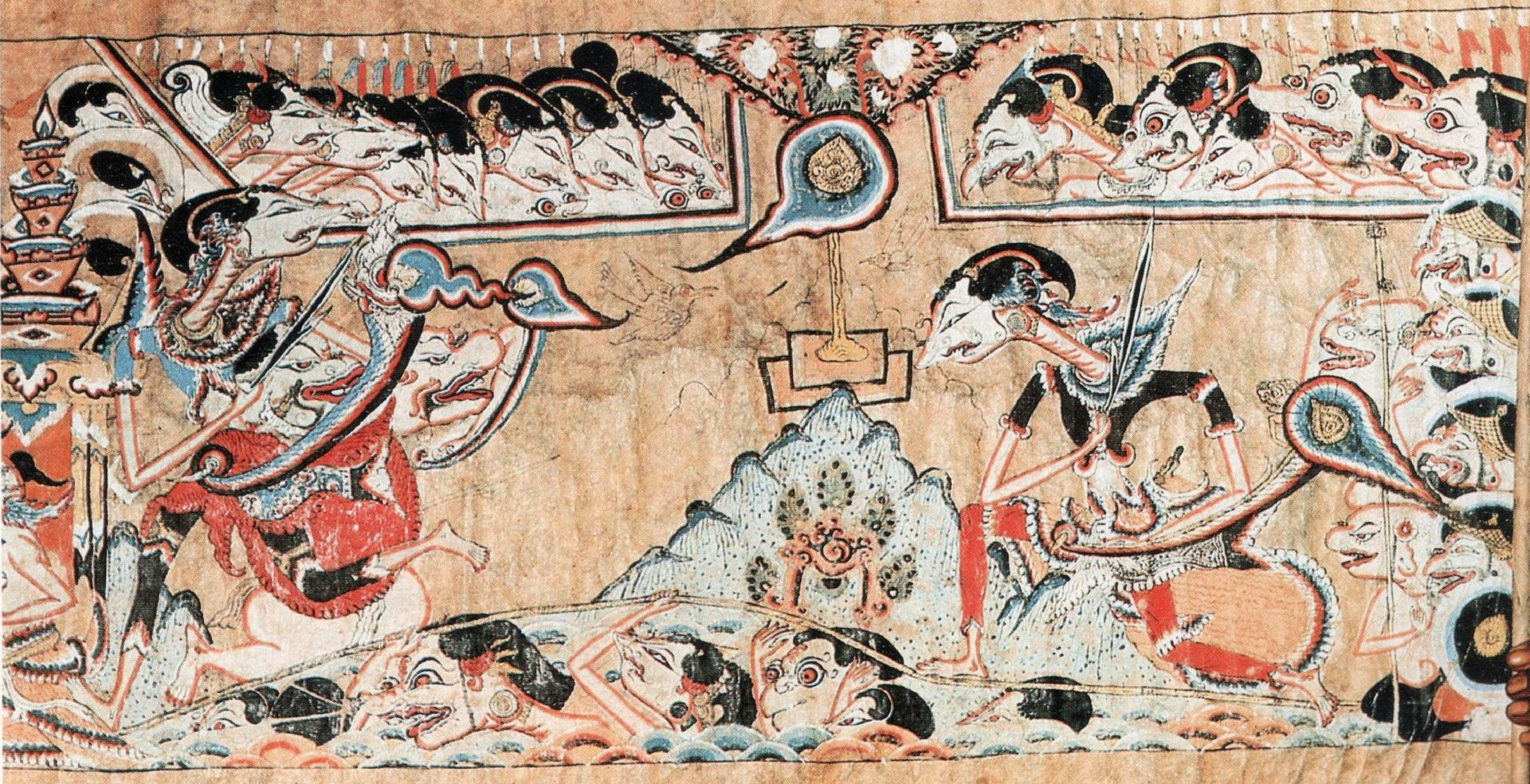
Competition between Panji Sepuh (left) and Jaya Puspita (right), 18th century

=== Wayang wong ===
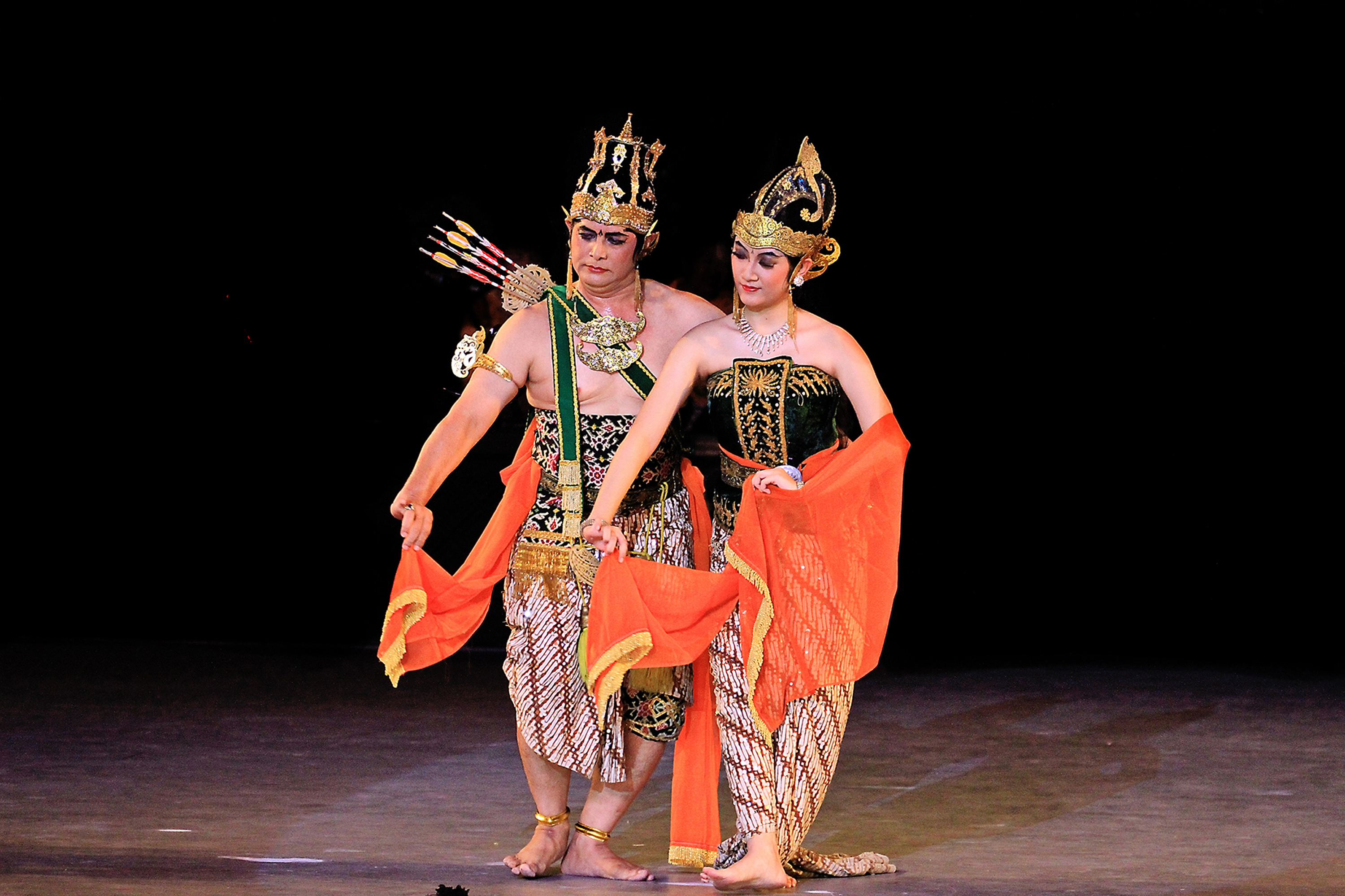
Rama and Shinta in a wayang wong Ramayana Ballet performance

Wayang wong, also known as wayang orang (lit. 'human wayang'), is a type of Javanese theatrical performance wherein human characters imitate the movements of a puppet show. The show also integrates dance by the human characters into the dramatic performance. It typically shows episodes of the Ramayana or the Mahabharata.

=== Wayang topeng ===
Wayang topeng (Javanese: ꦮꦪꦁꦠꦺꦴꦥꦺꦁ, romanized: wayang topèng) or wayang gedhog (ꦮꦪꦁꦒꦼꦝꦺꦴꦒ꧀) theatrical performances take themes from the Panji cycle of stories from the kingdom of Janggala. The players wear masks known as wayang topeng or wayang gedhog. The word gedhog comes from kedhok (ꦏꦼꦝꦺꦴꦏ꧀) which, like topeng, means 'mask'.

Wayang gedhog centers on a love story about Princess Candra Kirana of Kediri and Raden Panji Asmarabangun, the legendary crown prince of Janggala. Candra Kirana was the incarnation of Dewi Ratih (the Hindu goddess of love) and Panji was an incarnation of Kamajaya (the Hindu god of love). Kirana's story has been given the title Smaradahana ("The fire of love"). At the end of the complicated story they finally marry and bring forth a son named Raja Putra. Originally, wayang wong was performed only as an aristocratic entertainment in the palaces of Yogyakarta and Surakarta. In the course of time, it spread to become a popular and folk form as well.

Some examples of wayang topeng scenes

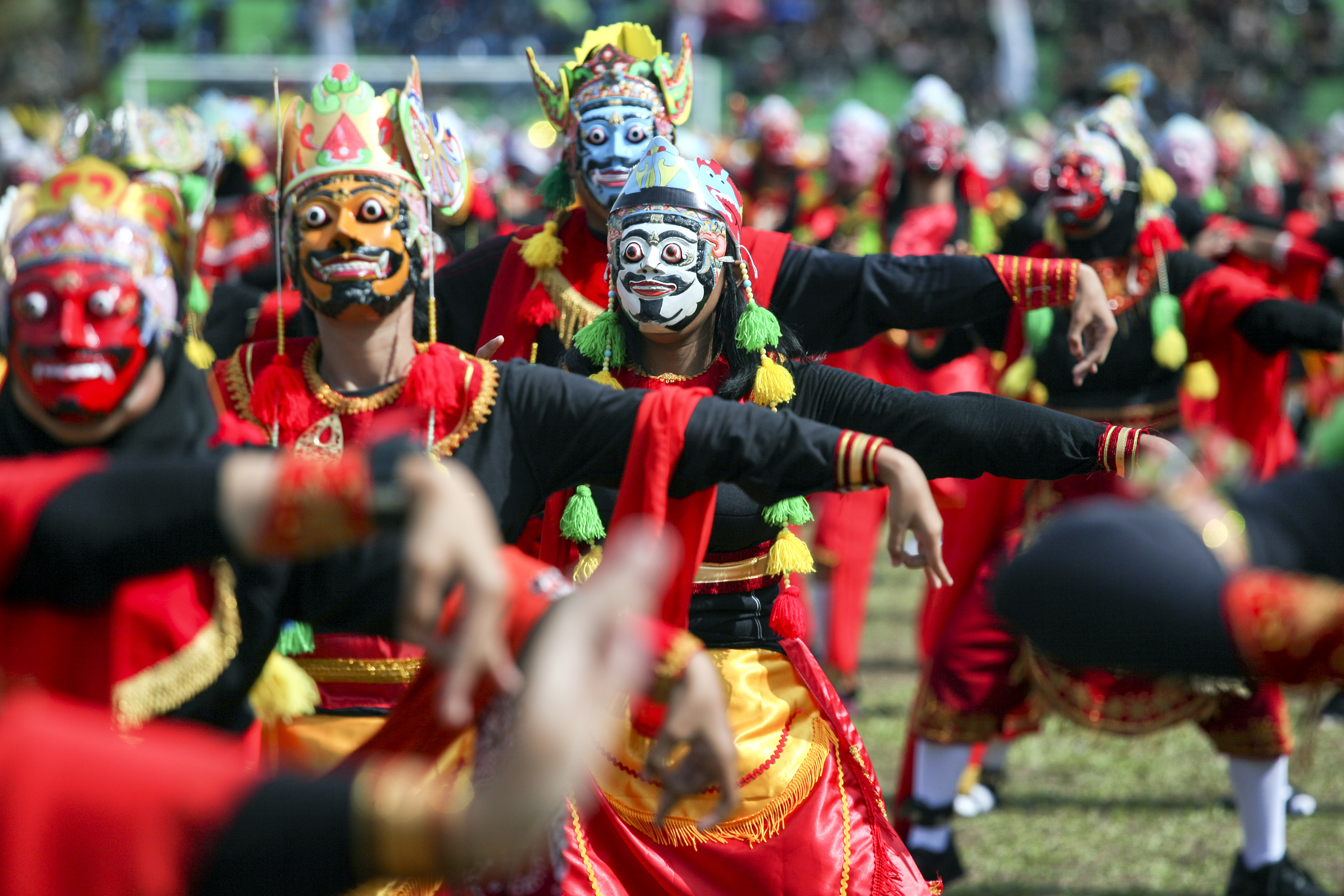
Dancing wayang topeng in Malang

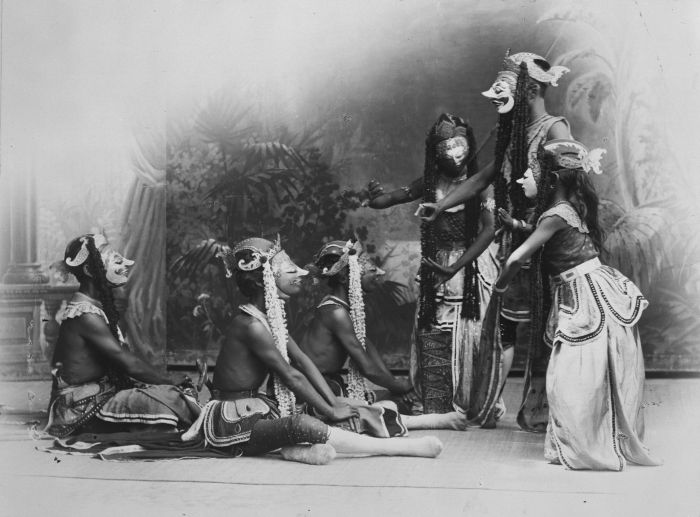
Studio portrait of wayang topeng actors

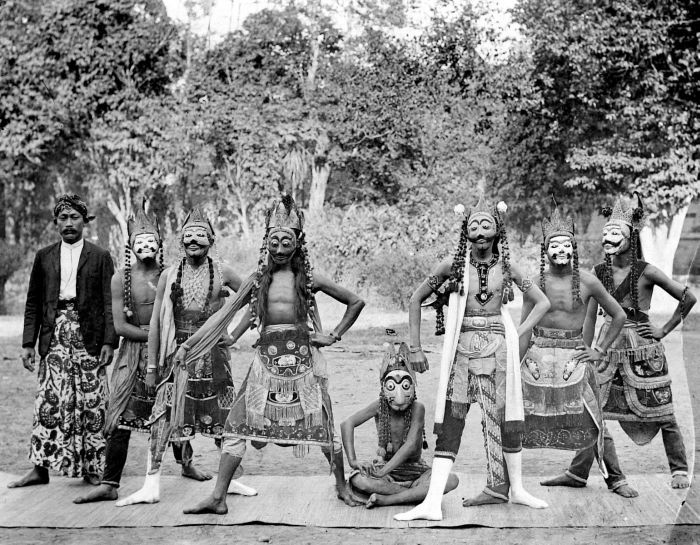
Wayang topeng Malang

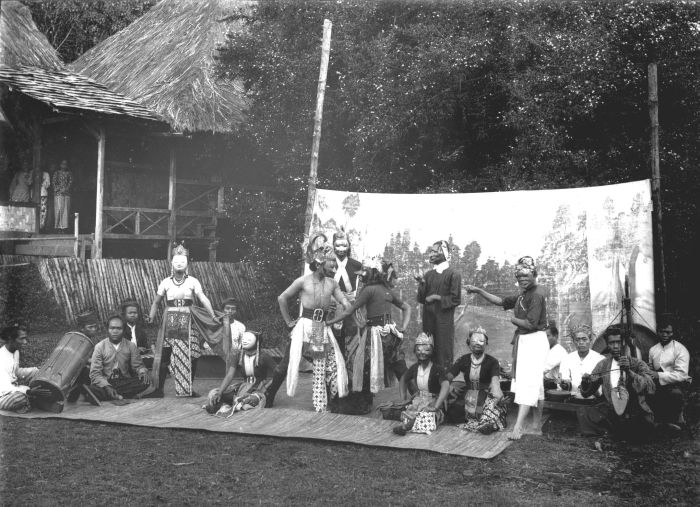
Wayang topeng in Java

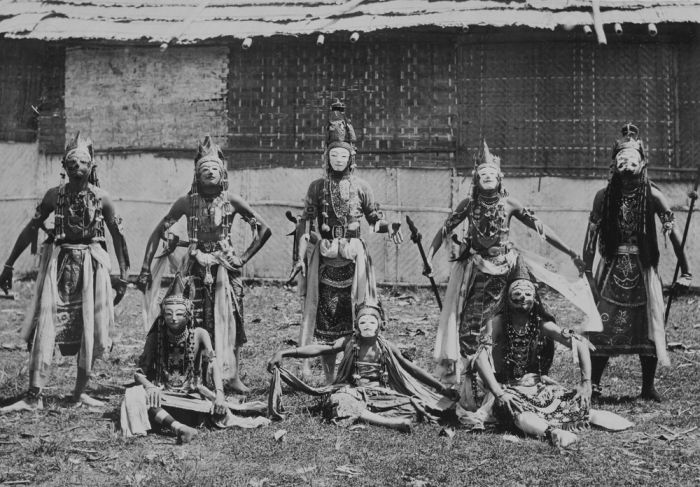
Wayang topeng in Java

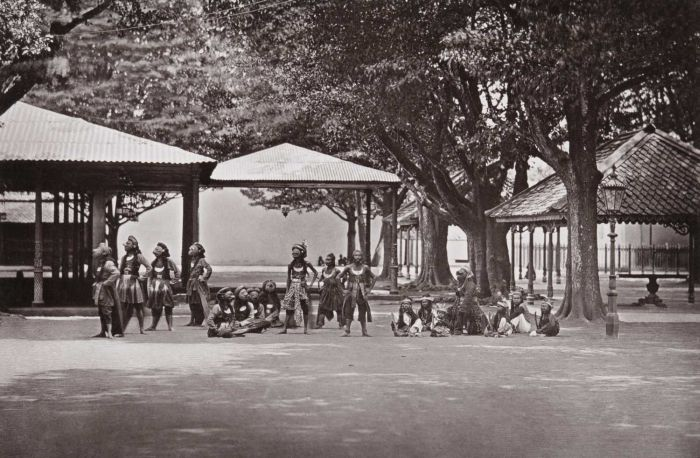
Wayang topeng in Java

== Stories ==
Wayang characters are derived from several groups of stories and settings. The most popular and the most ancient is wayang purwa, whose story and characters were derived from the Indian Hindu epics the Ramayana and Mahabharata, set in the ancient kingdoms of Hastinapura, Ayodhya, and Alengkapura (Lanka). Another group of characters is derived from the Panji cycle, natively developed in Java during the Kediri Kingdom; these stories are set in the twin Javanese kingdoms of Janggala and Panjalu (Kediri).

=== Wayang purwa ===
Wayang purwa (Javanese: ꦮꦪꦁꦥꦸꦂꦮ, lit. 'ancient wayang') refer to wayang that are based on the Hindu epics the Ramayana and Mahabharata. They are usually performed as wayang kulit, wayang golek, and wayang wong dance dramas.

In Central Java, popular wayang kulit characters include:

Satriya

- Bima
- Arjuna
- Dursasana
- Nakula
- Sadewa
- Antareja
- Ghatotkaca
- Antasena
- Abimanyu
- Wisanggeni
- Irawan
- Sumantri
- Wibisana

Raja

- Arjuna Sasrabahu
- Rama Wijaya
- Dasamuka
- Destarata
- Pandu Dewanata
- Subali and Sugriwa
- Barata
- Baladewa
- Duryudana
- Kresna
- Karna
- Yudhistira

Dewa

- Sang Hyang Tunggal
- Sang Hyang Wenang
- Batara Narada
- Batara Guru
- Dewa Ruci
- Batara Indra
- Batara Surya
- Batara Wisnu
- Sang Hyang Nagaraja
- Lembu Andini
- Batara Ganesha

Resi

- Anoman
- Bhisma
- Durna
- Rama Bargawa

Putri

- Sinta
- Kunti
- Drupadi
- Sumbadra
- Srikandi

Abdi

- Semar
- Gareng
- Petruk
- Bagong

Raksasa

- Kumbakarna
- Sarpakanaka
- Indrajit Megananda
- Sukrasana
- Kalabendana
- Cakil

Wayang purwa figures from Balinese wayang kulit

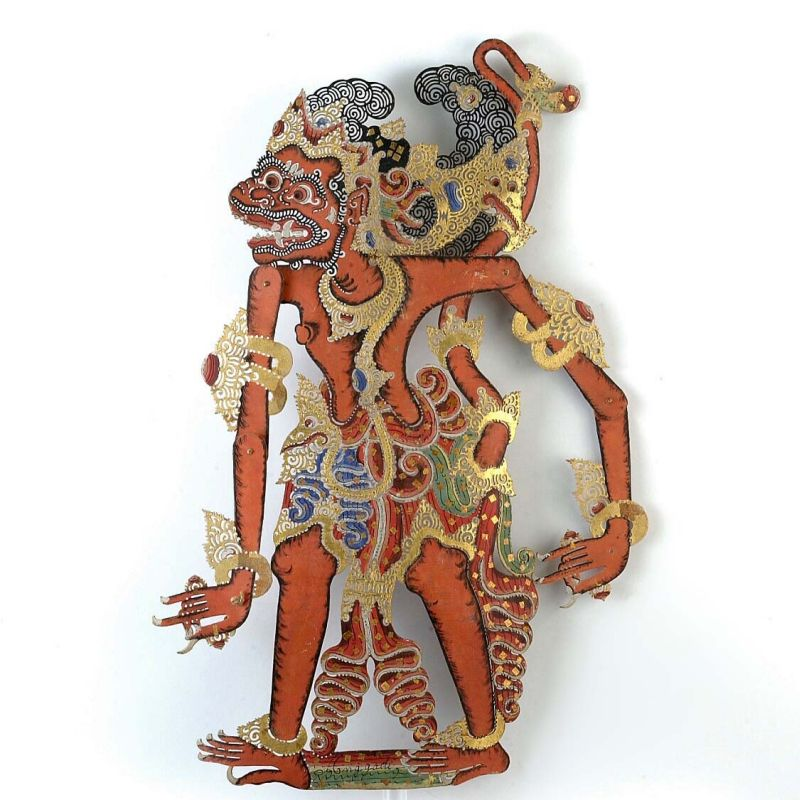
Wayang kulit Anggada, Tropenmuseum collection, Indonesia, before 1900

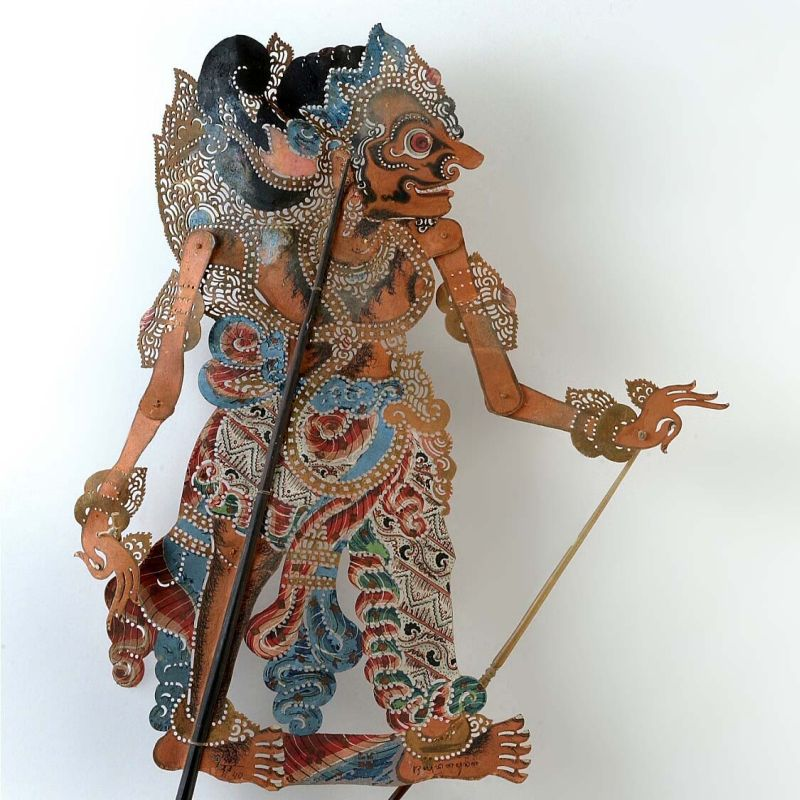
Wayang kulit Jayadrata, Tropenmuseum collection, Indonesia, before 1900

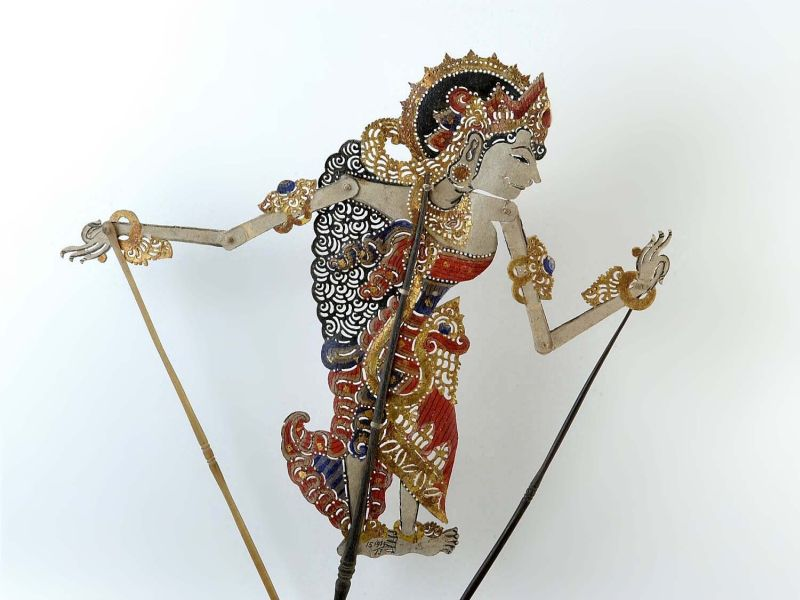
Wayang kulit Kendran, Tropenmuseum collection, Indonesia, before 1900

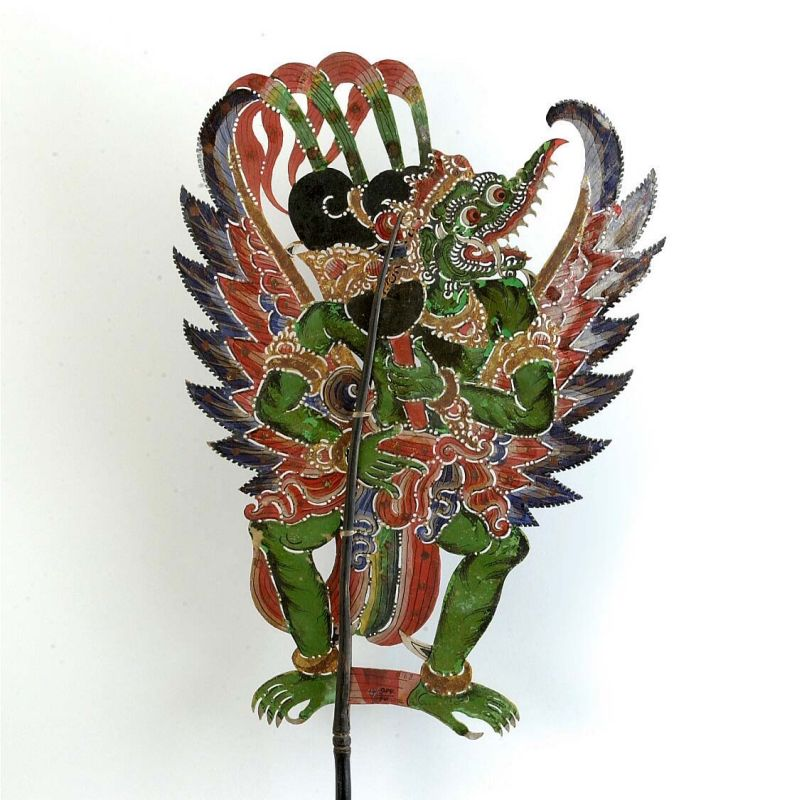
Wayang kulit Sangruda, Tropenmuseum collection, Indonesia, before 1900

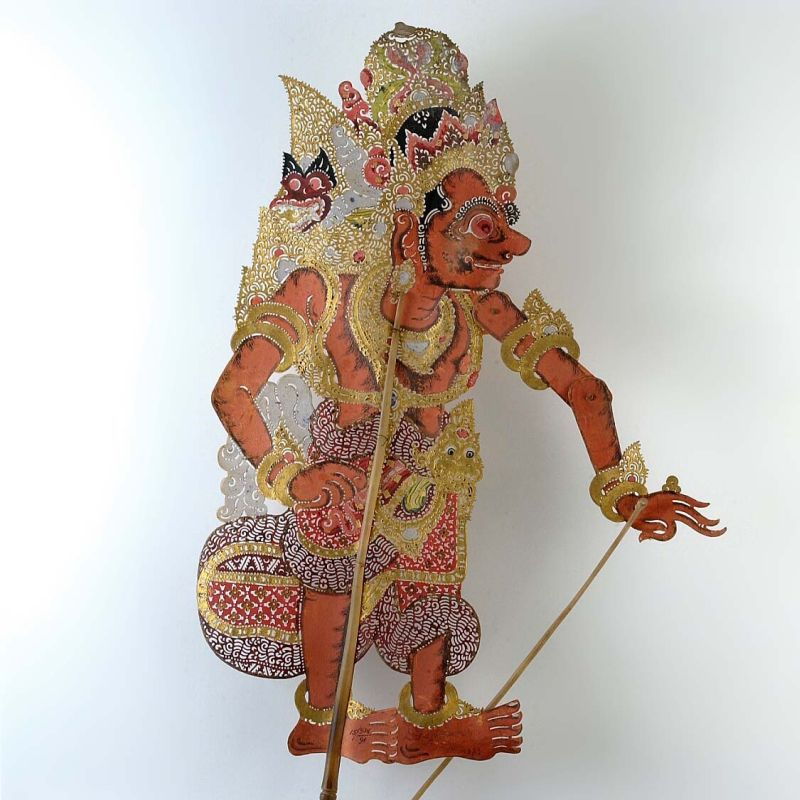
Wayang kulit Duryadana, Tropenmuseum collection, Indonesia, before 1900

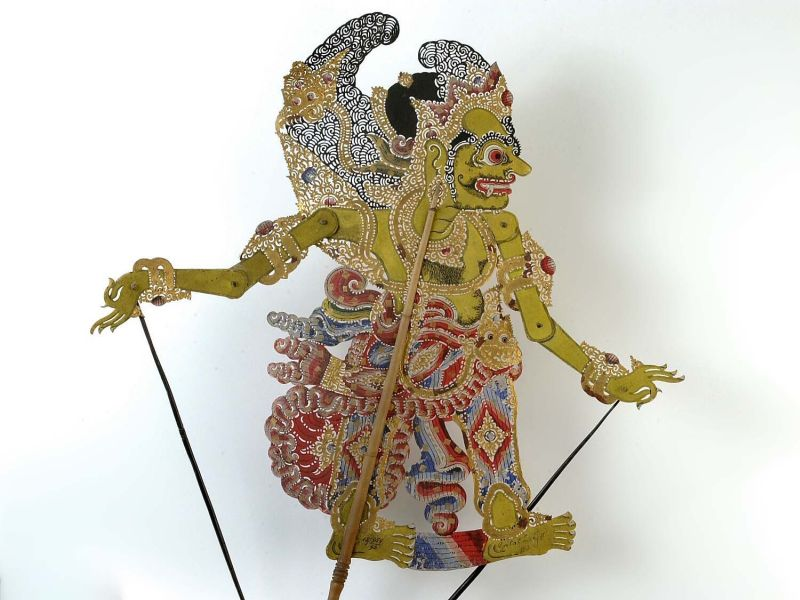
Wayang kulit Gatakaca, Tropenmuseum collection, Indonesia, before 1900

=== Wayang panji ===
Derived from the Panji cycles, natively developed in Java during the Kediri Kingdom, the story set in the twin Javanese kingdoms of Janggala and Panjalu (Kediri). Its form of expressions are usually performed as wayang gedhog (lit. 'masked wayang') and wayang wong dance dramas of Java and Bali.

- Raden Panji, alias Panji Asmoro Bangun, alias Panji Kuda Wanengpati, alias Inu Kertapati
- Galuh Chandra Kirana, alias Sekartaji
- Panji Semirang, alias Kuda Narawangsa, the male disguise of Princess Kirana
- Anggraeni

=== Wayang Menak ===
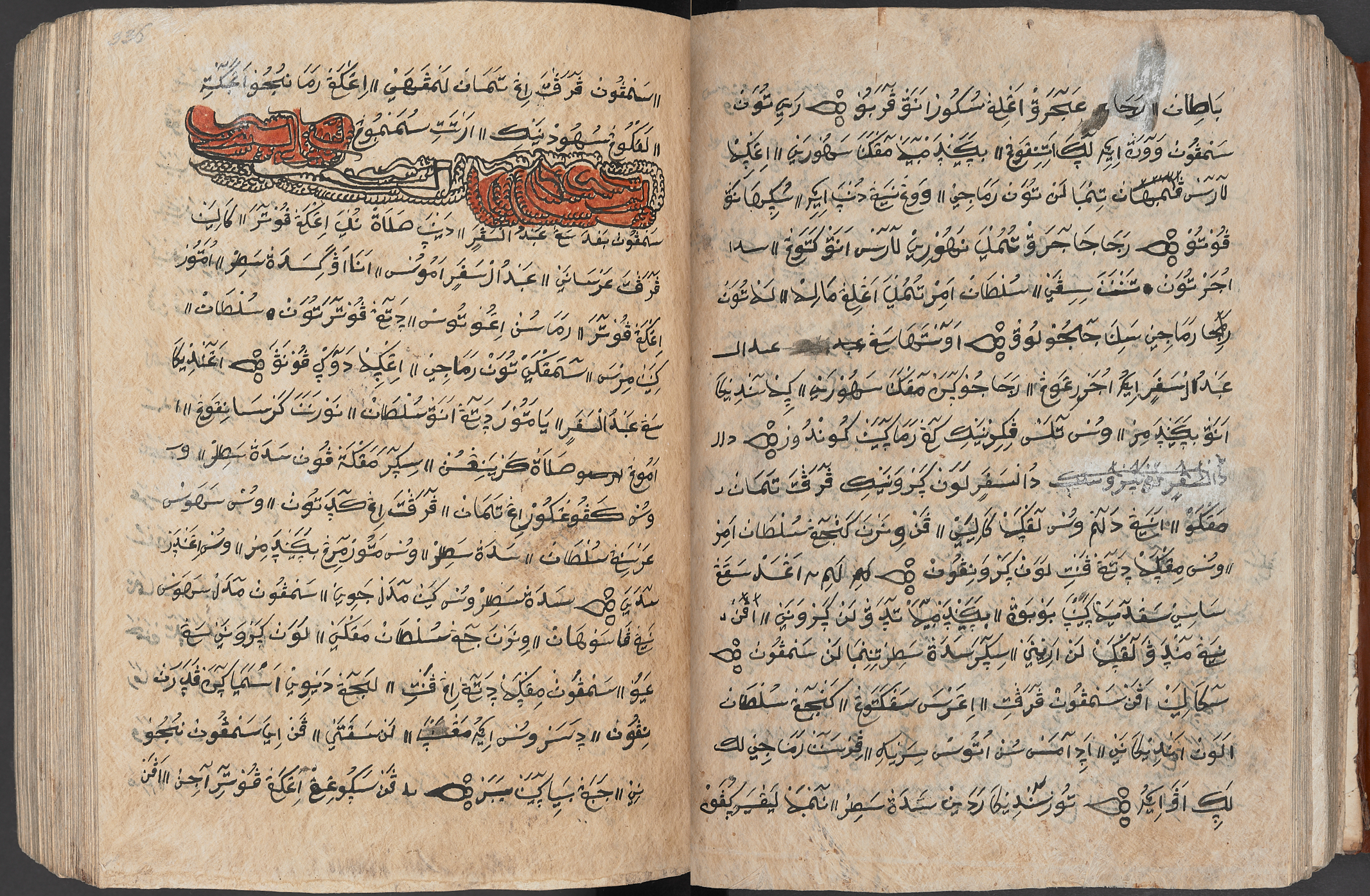
Menak Amir Hamzah manuscripts, before 1792.

Menak (Javanese: ꦩꦺꦤꦏ꧀, romanized: Ménak) is a cycle of wayang puppet plays that feature the heroic exploits of Wong Agung Jayengrana, who is based on the 12th-century Muslim literary hero Amir Hamzah. Menak stories have been performed in the islands of Java and Lombok in the Indonesian archipelago for several hundred years. They are predominantly performed in Java as wayang golek, or wooden rod-puppets, but also can be found on Lombok as the shadow puppet tradition, wayang sasak. The wayang golek menak tradition most likely originated along the north coast of Java under Chinese Muslim influences and spread East and South and is now most commonly found in the South Coastal region of Kabumen and Yogyakarta.

The word Ménak is a Javanese honorific title that is given to people who are recognized at court for their exemplary character even though they are not nobly born. Jayengrana is just such a character who inspires allegiance and devotion through his selfless modesty and his devotion to a monotheistic faith called the "Religion of Abraham." Jayengrana and his numerous followers do battle with the pagan faiths that threaten their peaceable realm of Koparman. The chief instigator of trouble is Pati Bestak, counselor to King Nuresewan, who goads pagan kings to capture Jayengrana's wife Dewi Munninggar. The pagan Kings eventually fail to capture her and either submit to Jayengrana and renounce their pagan faith or die swiftly in combat.

The literary figure of Amir Hamzah is loosely based on the historic person of Hamza ibn Abdul-Muttalib who was the paternal uncle of Muhammad. Hamzah was a fierce warrior who fought alongside Muhammad and died in the battle of Uhud in 624 CE. the literary tradition traveled from Persia to India and from then on to Southeast Asia where the court poet Yasadipura I (1729-1802) set down the epic in the Javanese language in the Serat Menak.

The wooden wayang menak is similar in shape to wayang golek; it is most prevalent on the northern coast of Central Java, especially the Kudus area.

- Wong Agung Jayengrana/Amir Ambyah/Amir Hamzah
- Prabu Nursewan
- Umar Maya
- Umar Madi
- Dewi Retna Muninggar
Menak figures from Javanese wayang golek

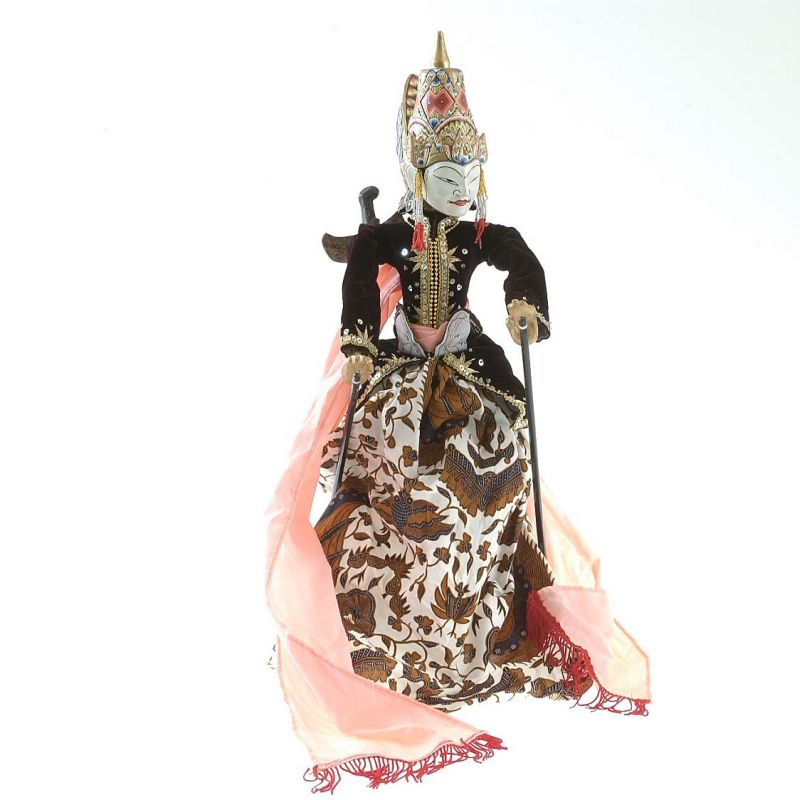
Wayang golek menak, Jayengrana, a collection from Tropenmuseum, the Netherlands, before 2003

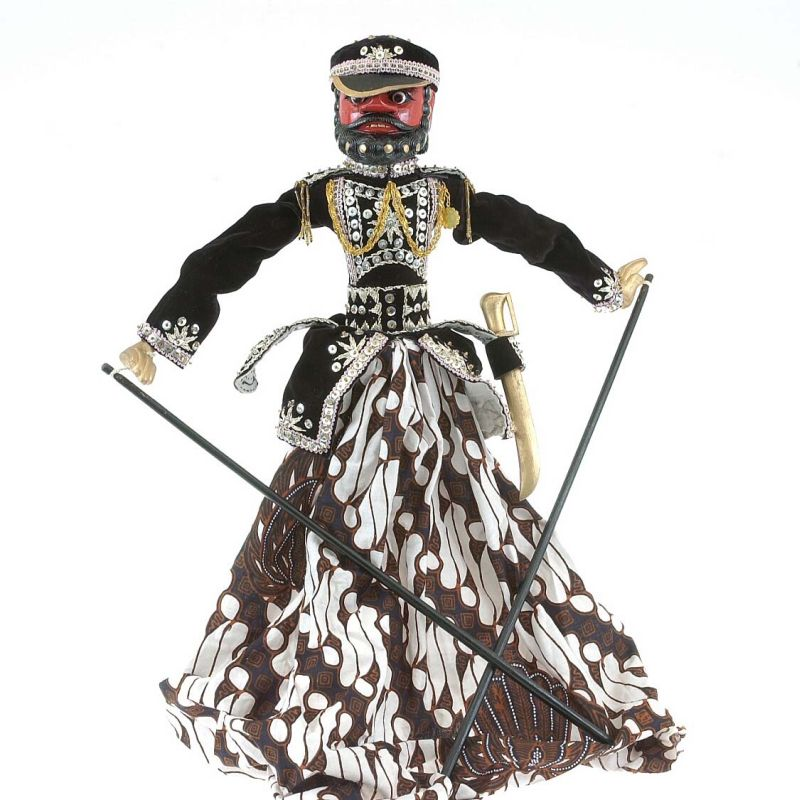
Wayang golek menak, Umarmaya, a collection at Tropenmuseum, the Netherlands, before 2003

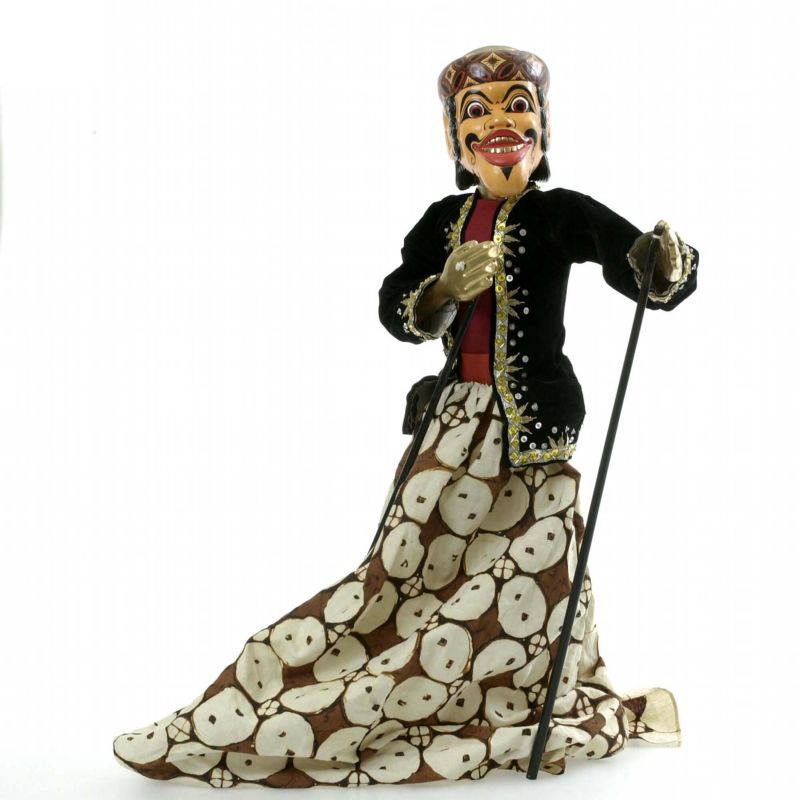
Wayang golek menak, Umarmadi, a collection at Tropenmuseum, the Netherlands, before 2003

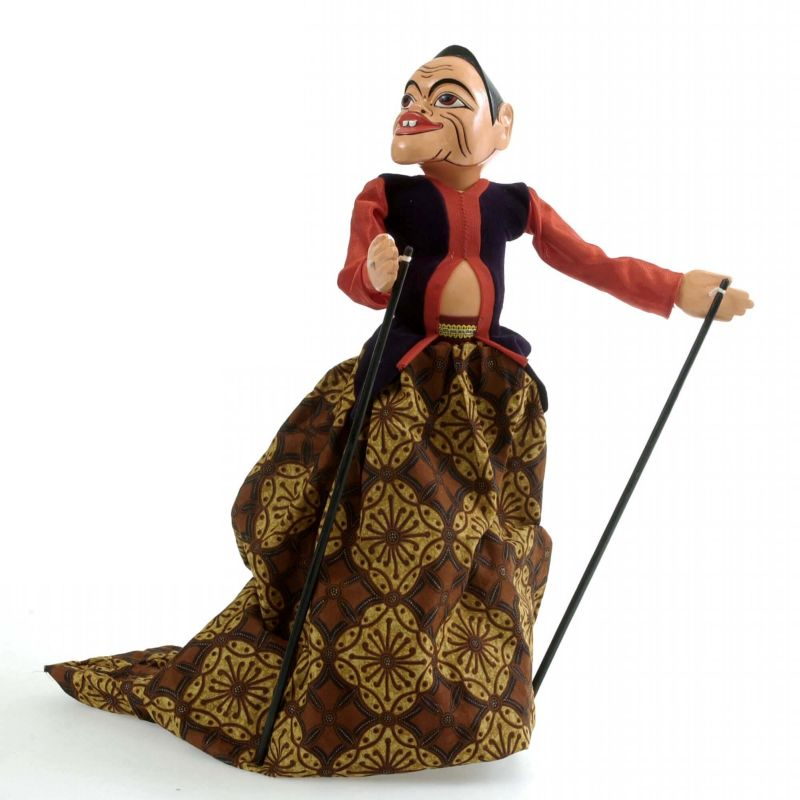
Wayang golek menak, Jiweng, a collection at Tropenmuseum, the Netherlands, before 2003

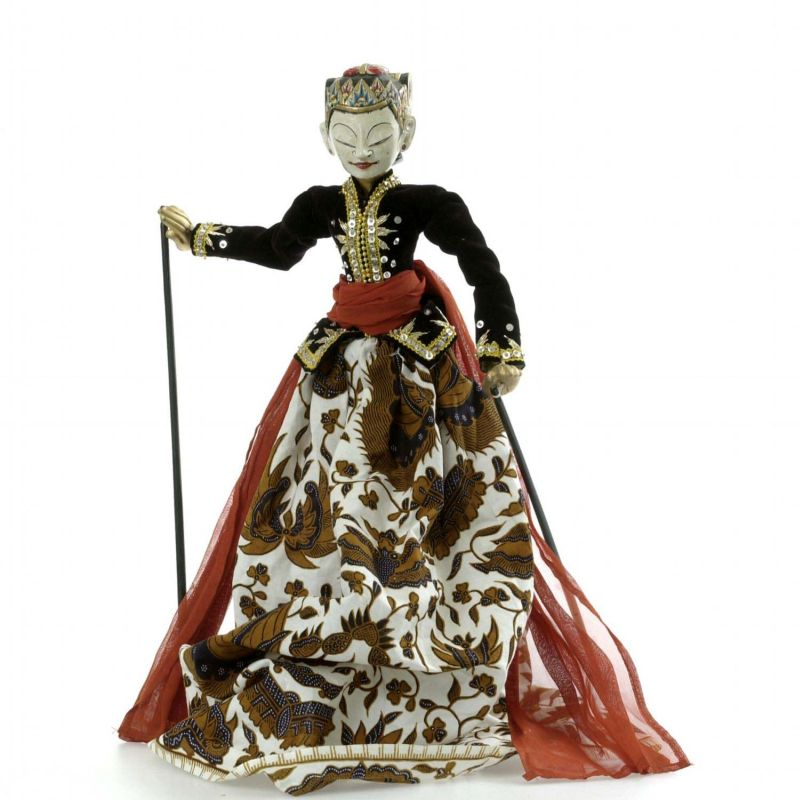
Wayang golek menak, Putri Murtinjung, a collection at Tropenmuseum, the Netherlands, before 2003

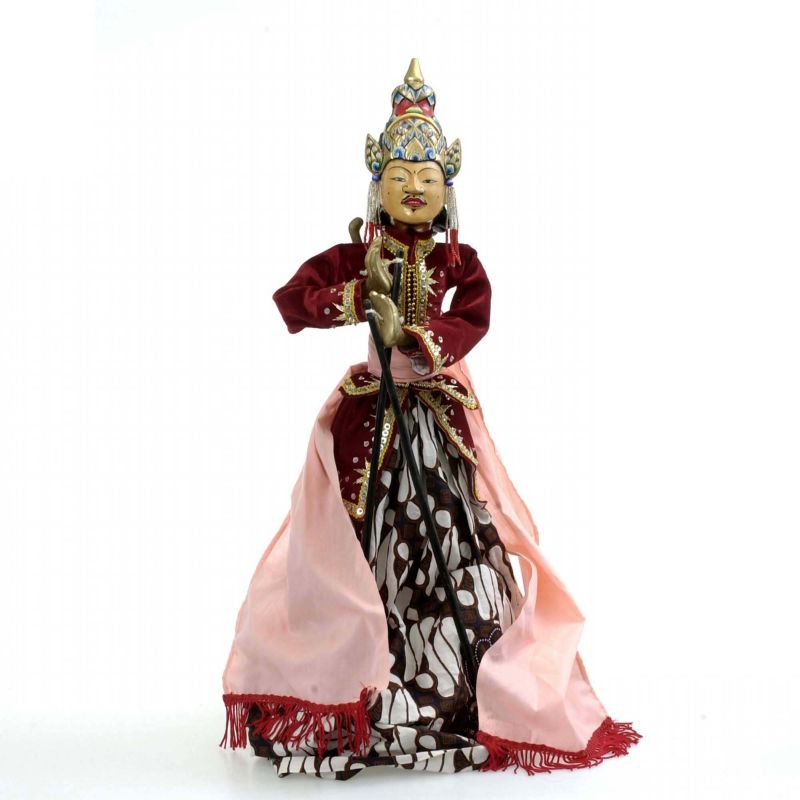
Wayang golek menak, King Maktal (Albania), a collection at Tropenmuseum, the Netherlands, before 2003

=== Wayang kancil ===
Wayang kancil (Javanese: ꦮꦪꦁꦏꦚ꧀ꦕꦶꦭ꧀) is a type of shadow puppet with the main character of kancil (Javanese: ꦏꦚ꧀ꦕꦶꦭ꧀) and other animal stories taken from Hitopadeça and Tantri Kamandaka. Wayang kancil was created by Sunan Giri at the end of the 15th century and is used as a medium for preaching Islam in Gresik.

Kancil figures in wayang kulit

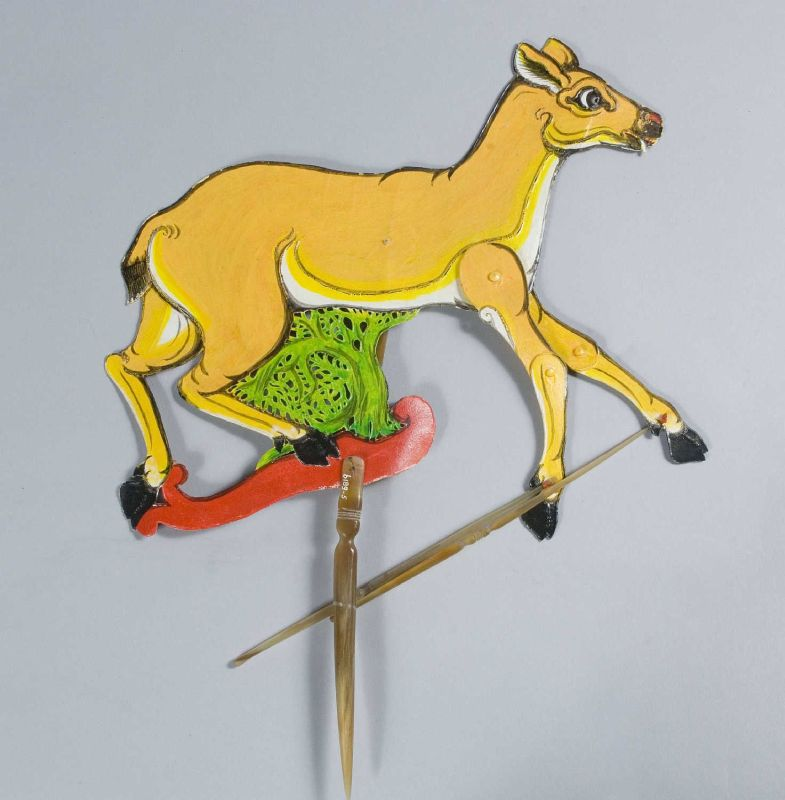
Kancil

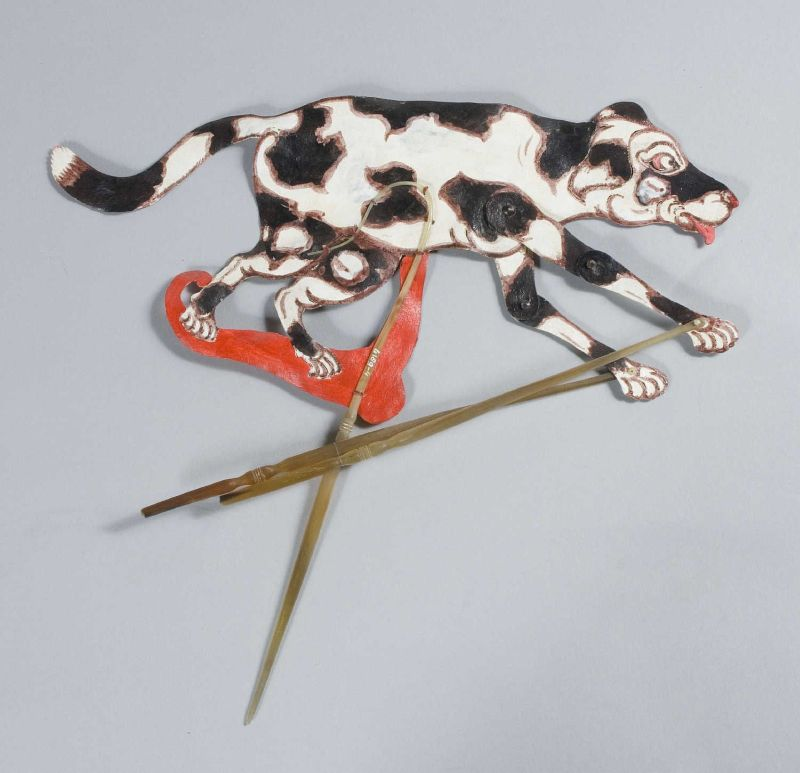
Srigala

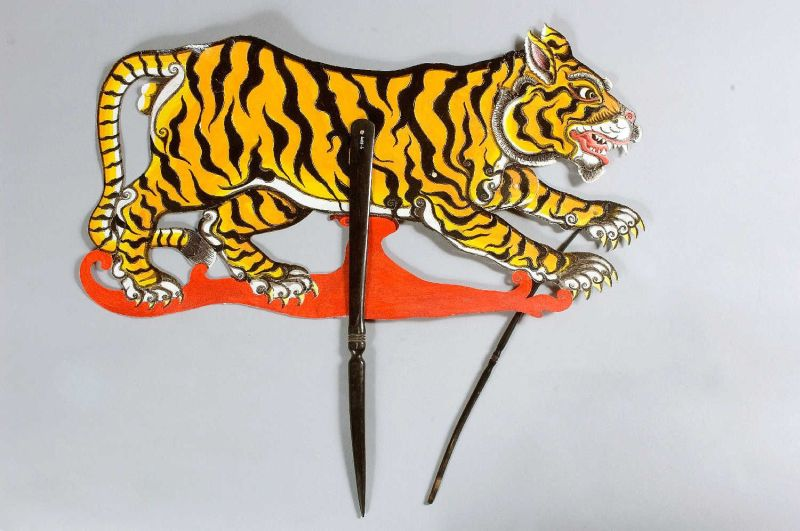
Macan

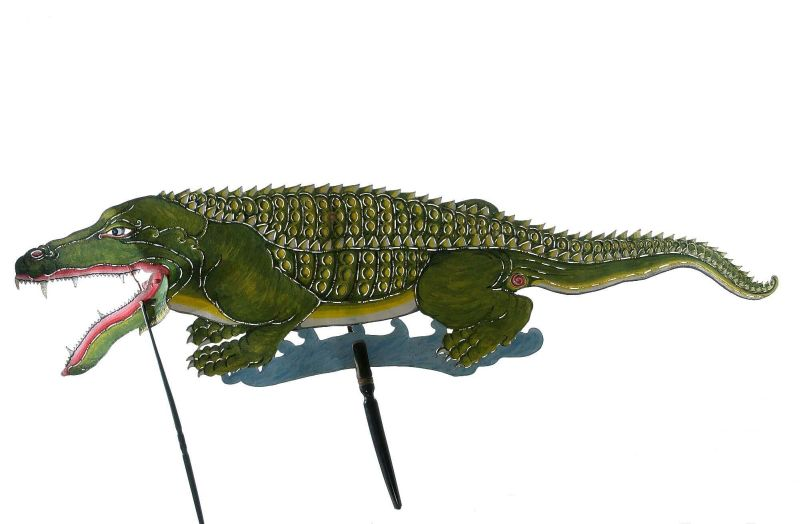
Baya

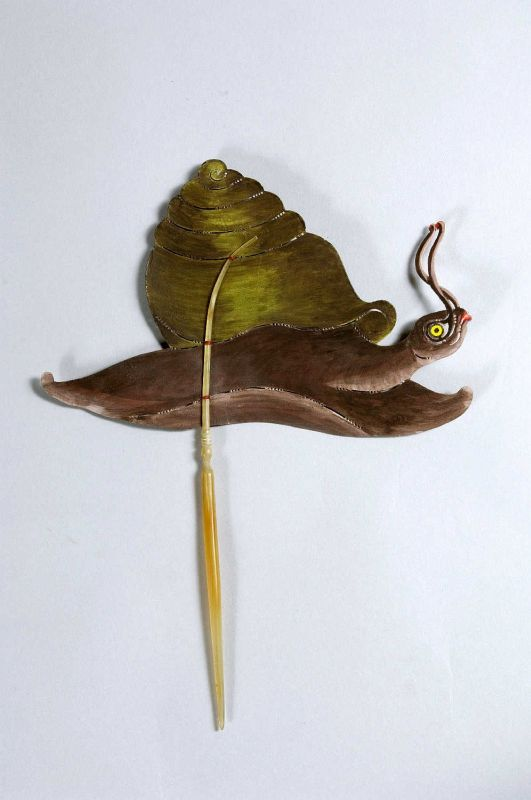
Keong

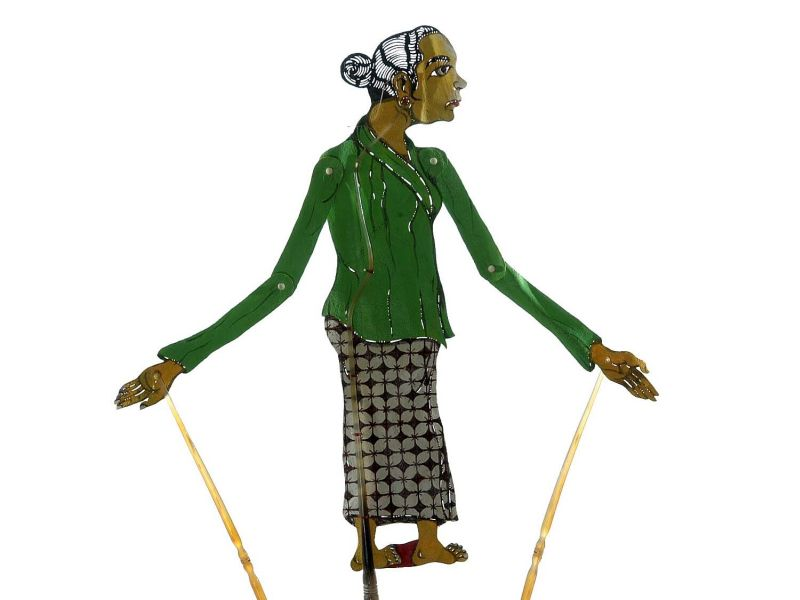
Nenek Petani

=== Contemporary retellings ===
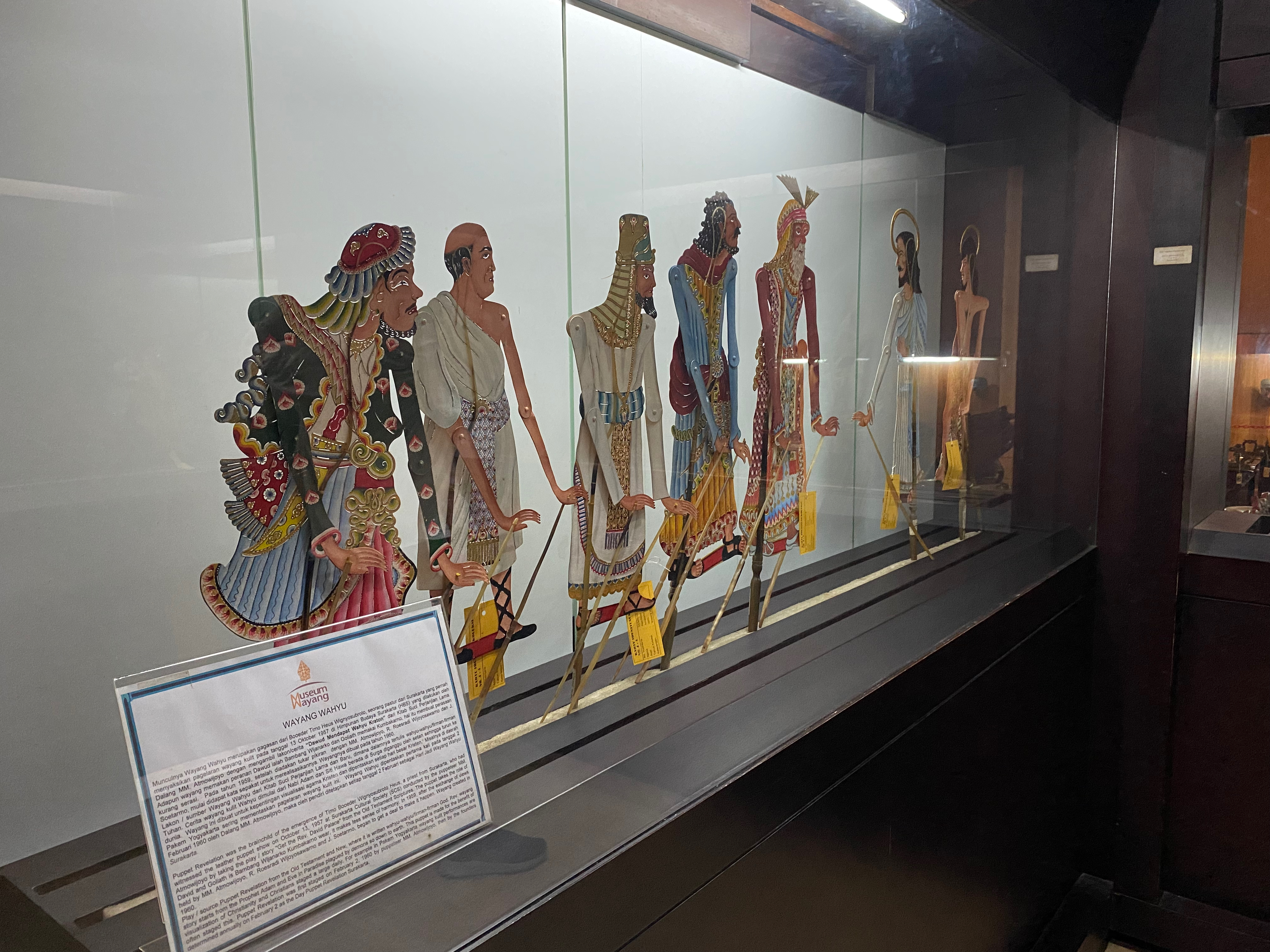
Wayang wahyu

In the 1960s, the Christian missionary effort adopted the art form to create wayang wahyu (Javanese: ꦮꦪꦁꦮꦃꦪꦸ). The Javanese Jesuit Brother Timotheus L. Wignyosubroto used the show to communicate to the Javanese and other Indonesians the teachings of the Bible and of the Catholic Church in a manner accessible to the audience. Similarly, wayang sadat (ꦮꦪꦁꦱꦢꦠ꧀) has deployed wayang for the religious teachings of Islam, while wayang Pancasila (ꦮꦪꦁꦥꦚ꧀ꦕꦱꦶꦭ) has used it as a medium for national politics.

There have also been attempts to retell modern fiction with the art of wayang, most famously Star Wars as done by Malaysians Tintuoy Chuo and Dalang Pak Dain.

== Artist ==
=== Dalang ===
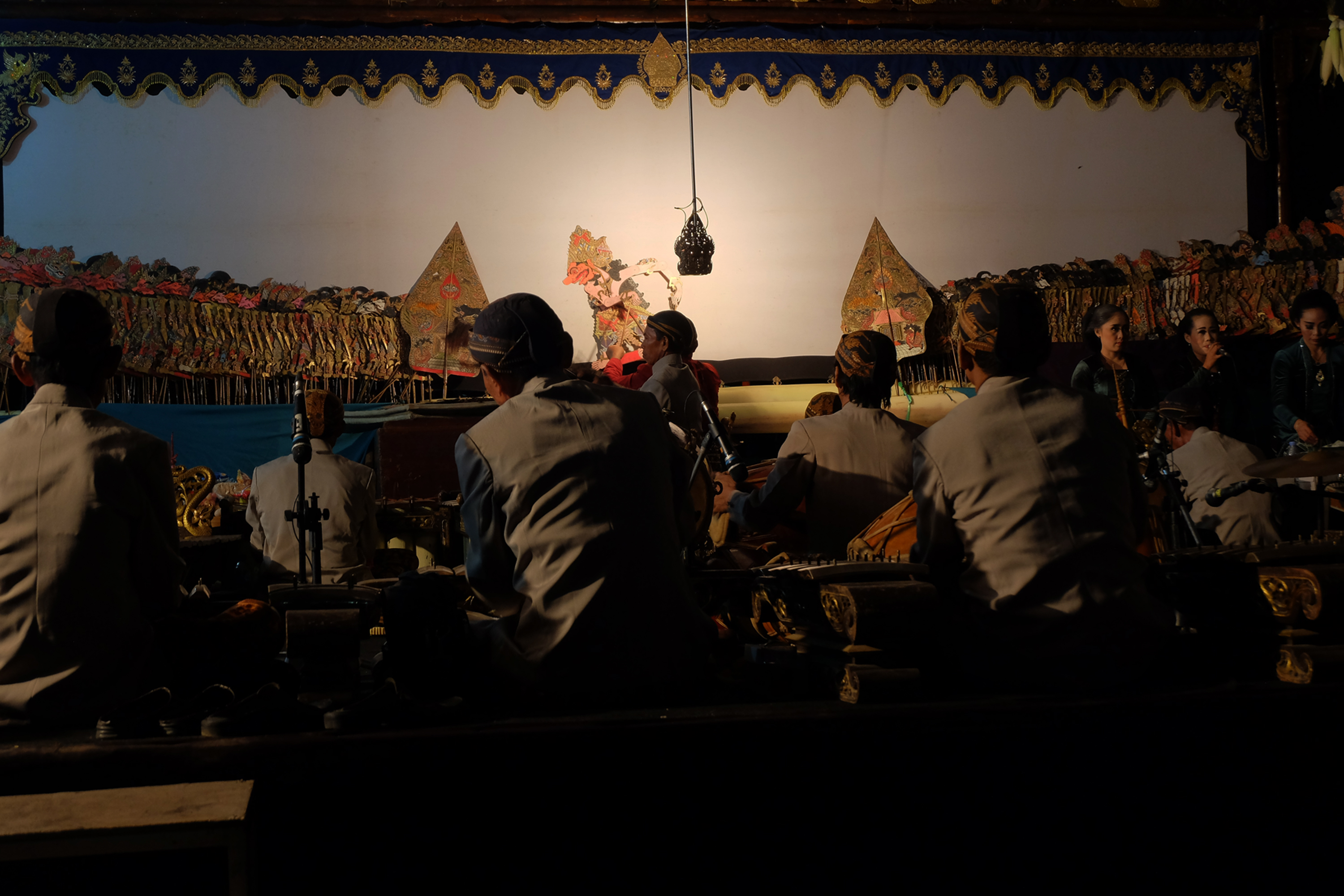
Dalang (puppet master), sindhen (traditional Javanese singer), and wiyaga (gamelan musicians) in a wayang kulit show in Java

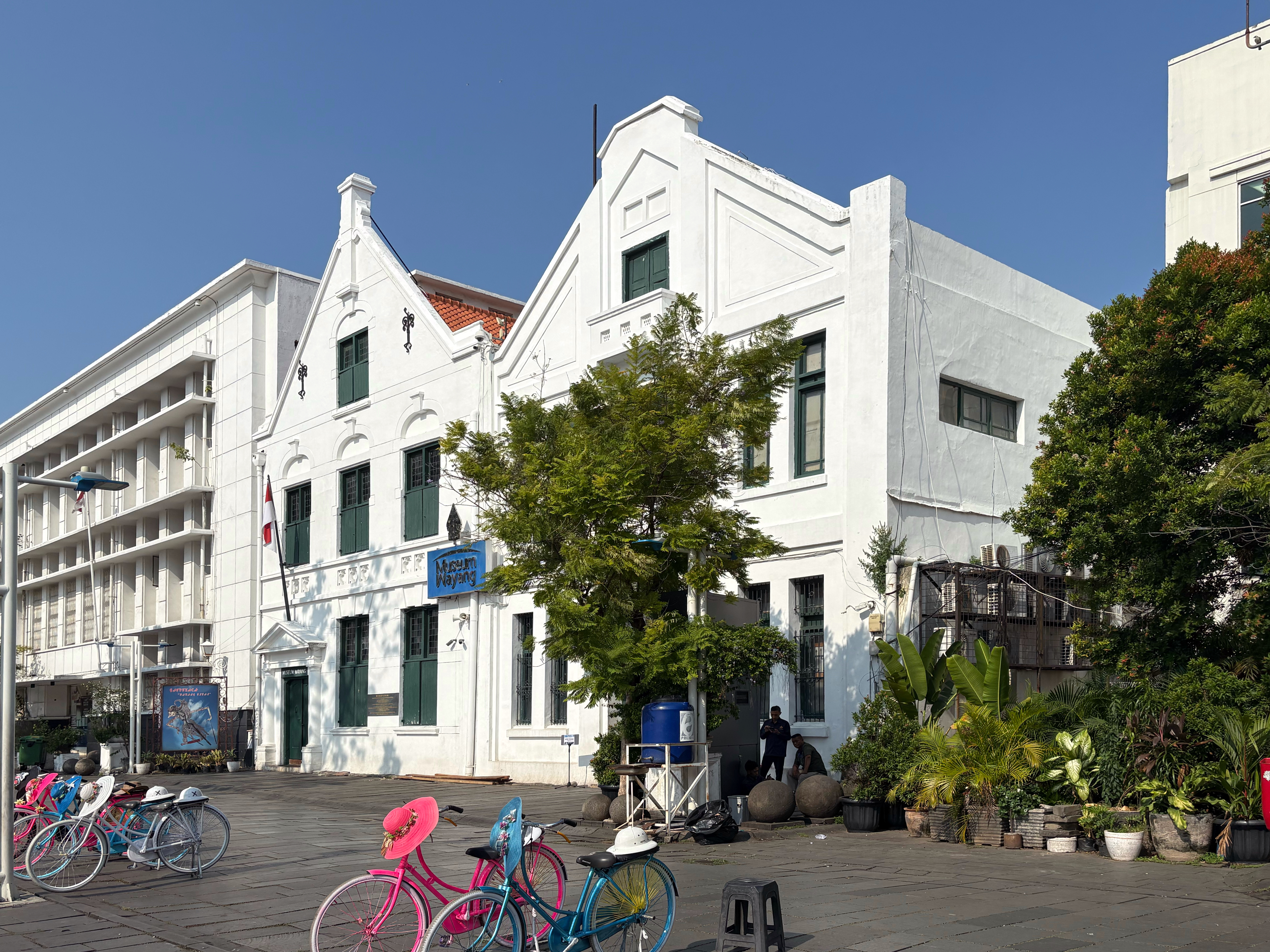
The front view of the Wayang Museum seen from Fatahillah Square (Indonesian: Taman Fatahillah)

The dalang, sometimes referred to as dhalang or kawi dalang, is the puppeteer behind the performance. It is he who sits behind the screen, sings and narrates the dialogues of different characters of the story. With a traditional orchestra in the background to provide a resonant melody and its conventional rhythm, the dalang modulates his voice to create suspense, thus heightening the drama. Invariably, the play climaxes with the triumph of good over evil. The dalang is highly respected in Indonesian culture for his knowledge, art and as a spiritual person capable of bringing to life the spiritual stories in the religious epics.

The figures of the wayang are also present in the paintings of that time, for example, the roof murals of the courtroom in Klungkung, Bali. They are still present in traditional Balinese painting today. The figures are painted, flat (5 to at most 15 mm — about half an inch — thick) woodcarvings with movable arms. The head is solidly attached to the body. Wayang klitik can be used to perform puppet plays either during the day or at night. This type of wayang is relatively rare.

=== Sindhen ===
Pesindhén or sindhén (from Javanese) is the term for a woman who sings to accompany a gamelan orchestra, generally as the sole singer. A good singer must have extensive communication skills and good vocal skills as well as the ability to sing many songs. The title Sinden comes from the word Pasindhian which means 'rich in songs' or 'who sing the song'. Pesindhen can be interpreted as someone singing a song. In addition, sinden is also commonly referred to as waranggana which is taken from a combination of the words wara and anggana. The word wara itself means 'someone who is female' and anggana which means 'itself'; in ancient times, the waranggana was the only woman in the wayang or klenengan performance.

=== Wiyaga ===
Wiyaga is a term in the musical arts which means a group of people who have special skills playing the gamelan, especially in accompanying traditional ceremonies and performing arts. Wiyaga is also called niyaga or nayaga which means 'gamelan musician'.

== Legacy ==
=== UNESCO designation ===
Wayang puppet theatre
- UNESCO Intangible Cultural Heritage
- Country: Indonesia
- Reference: 00063
- Region: Asia and the Pacific

Inscription history
- Inscription: 2008 (3rd session)
- List: Representative
- Wayang kulit (the leather shadow puppet), Wayang klitik (the flat wooden puppet), wayang golek (the three-dimensional wooden puppet)

UNESCO designated wayang – the flat leather shadow puppet (wayang kulit), the flat wooden puppet (wayang klitik), and the three-dimensional wooden puppet (wayang golek) theatre, as a Masterpiece of the Oral and Intangible Heritage of Humanity on 7 November 2003. In return for the acknowledgment, UNESCO required Indonesians to preserve the tradition.

=== Wayang Museum ===
The Wayang Museum is an Indonesian museum on the history of wayang puppetry. The museum has various types of Indonesian wayang collections such as wayang kulit, wayang golek, wayang klitik, wayang suket, and wayang beber. There is also a collection of masks (topeng), gamelan, and wayang paintings. The collections are not only from Indonesia, but there are many collections of puppets from various countries such as Malaysia, Thailand, Cambodia, Suriname, China, Vietnam, France, India, Turkey.

The Wayang Museum is located in Kota Tua Jakarta near the Jakarta History Museum.

== Gallery ==
Wayang Puppet Theater

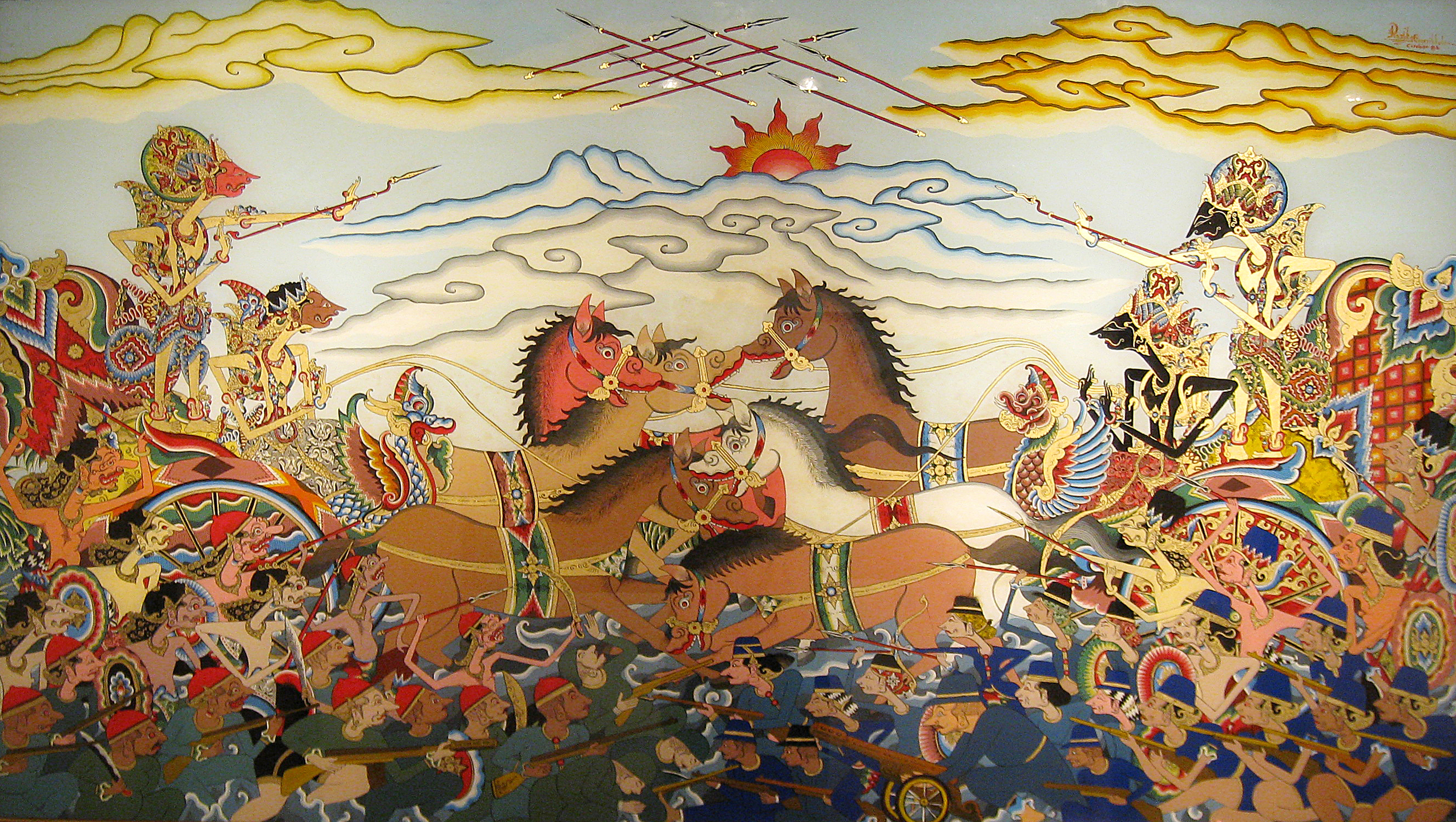
Wayang glass painting depiction of Bharatayudha battle.

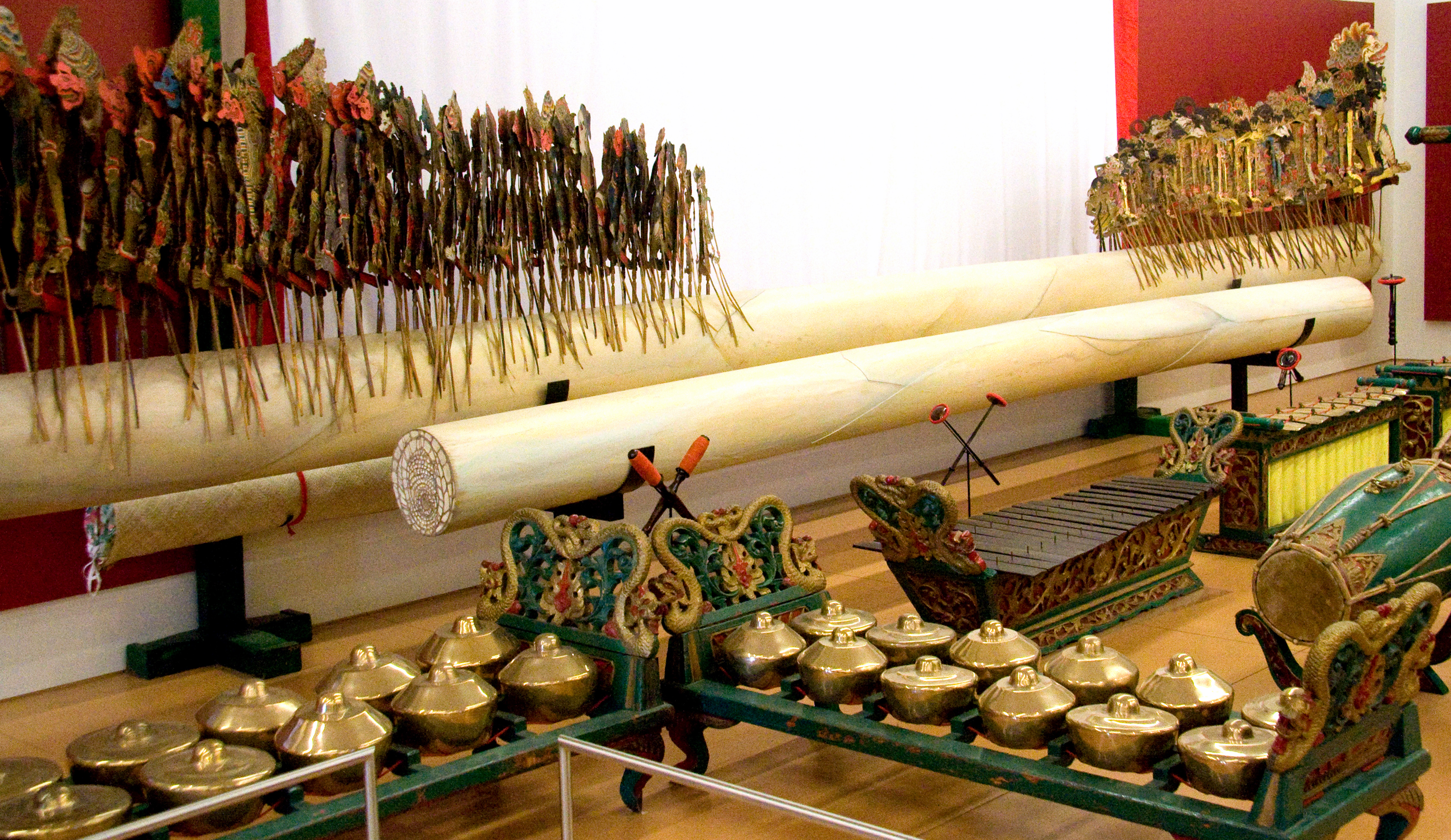
A wayang kulit set and a gamelan ensemble collection, Indonesia section at the Musical Instrument Museum, Phoenix, Arizona, United States.

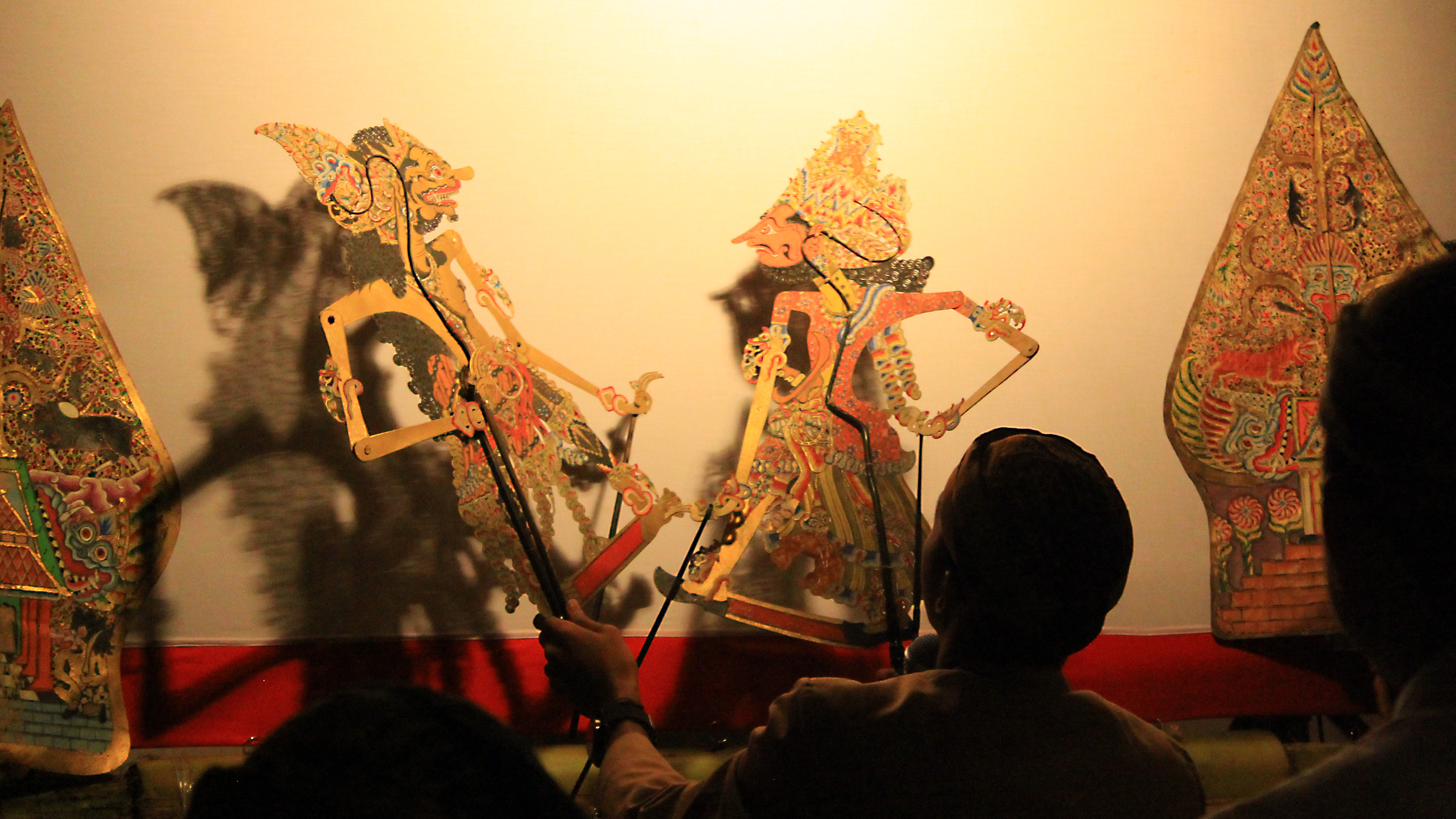
A wayang show in Java, Indonesia, presenting a wayang puppet.

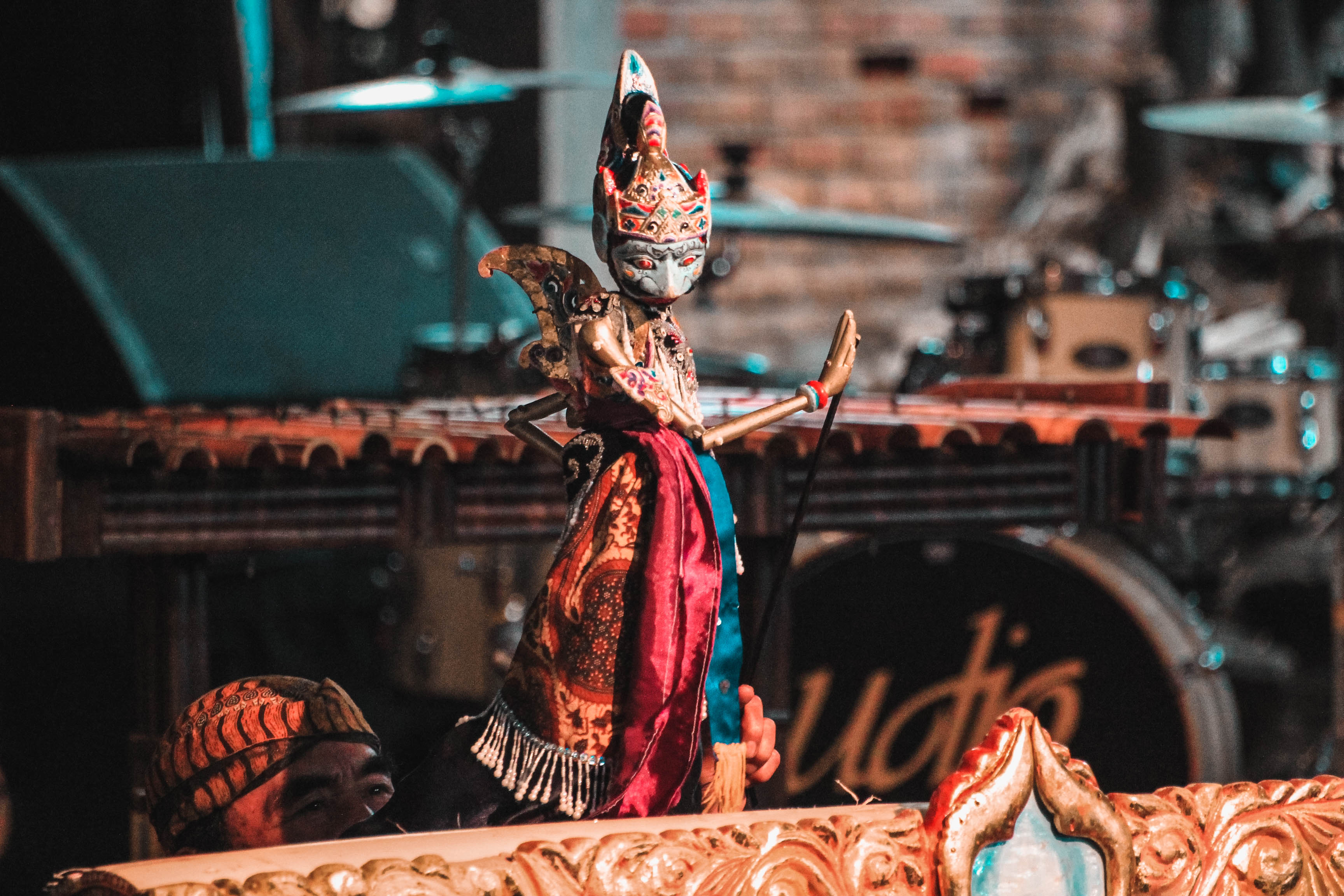
Wayang golek (3D wooden puppet), Gatot Kaca, Indonesia in 2017.

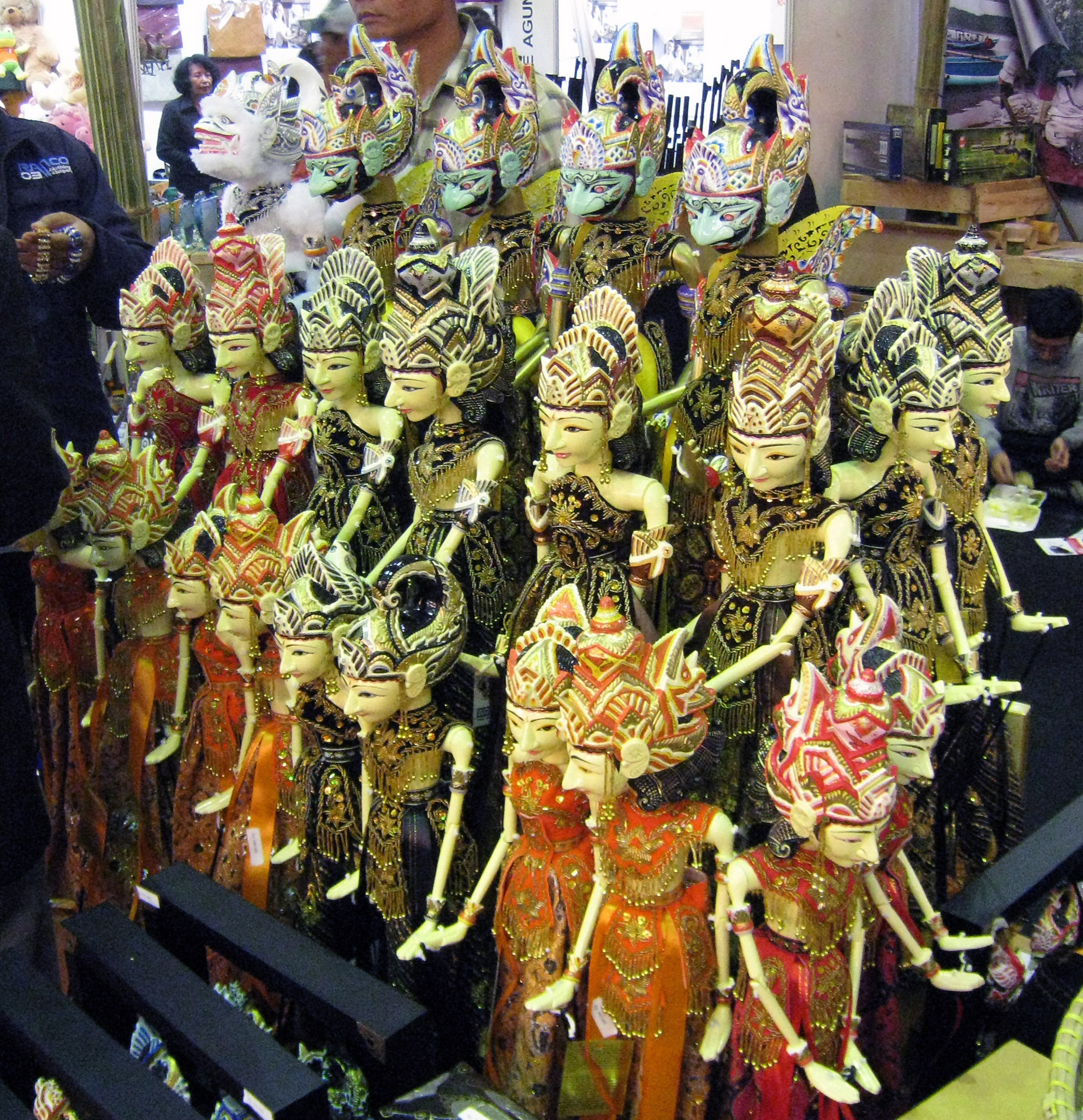
Sundanese wayang golek (3D wooden puppet), Indonesia.

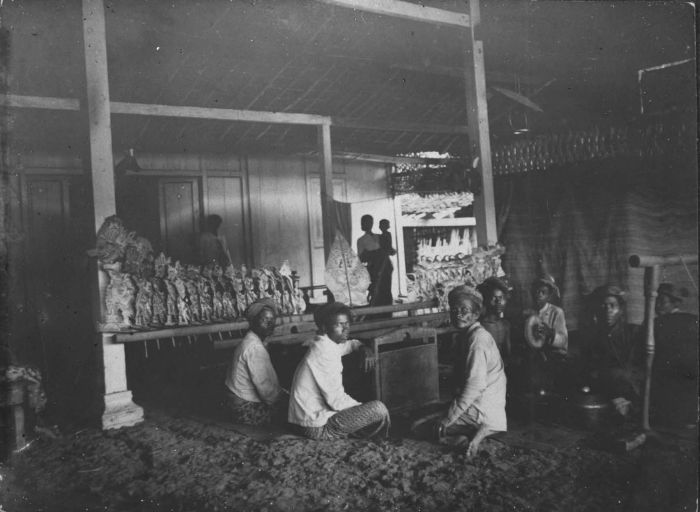
A wayang klitik (flat wooden puppet) performance with a gamelan orchestra in Ngandong, Java, in 1918.

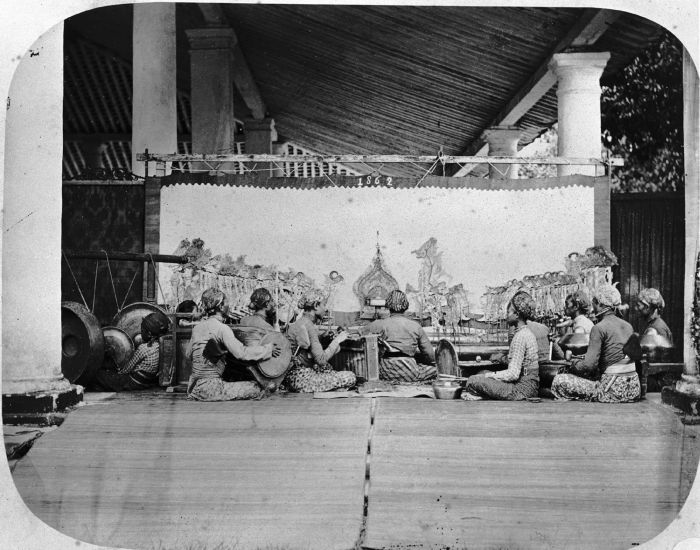
Wayang kulit (shadow puppet show) accompanied by a gamelan ensemble in Java, c. 1870.

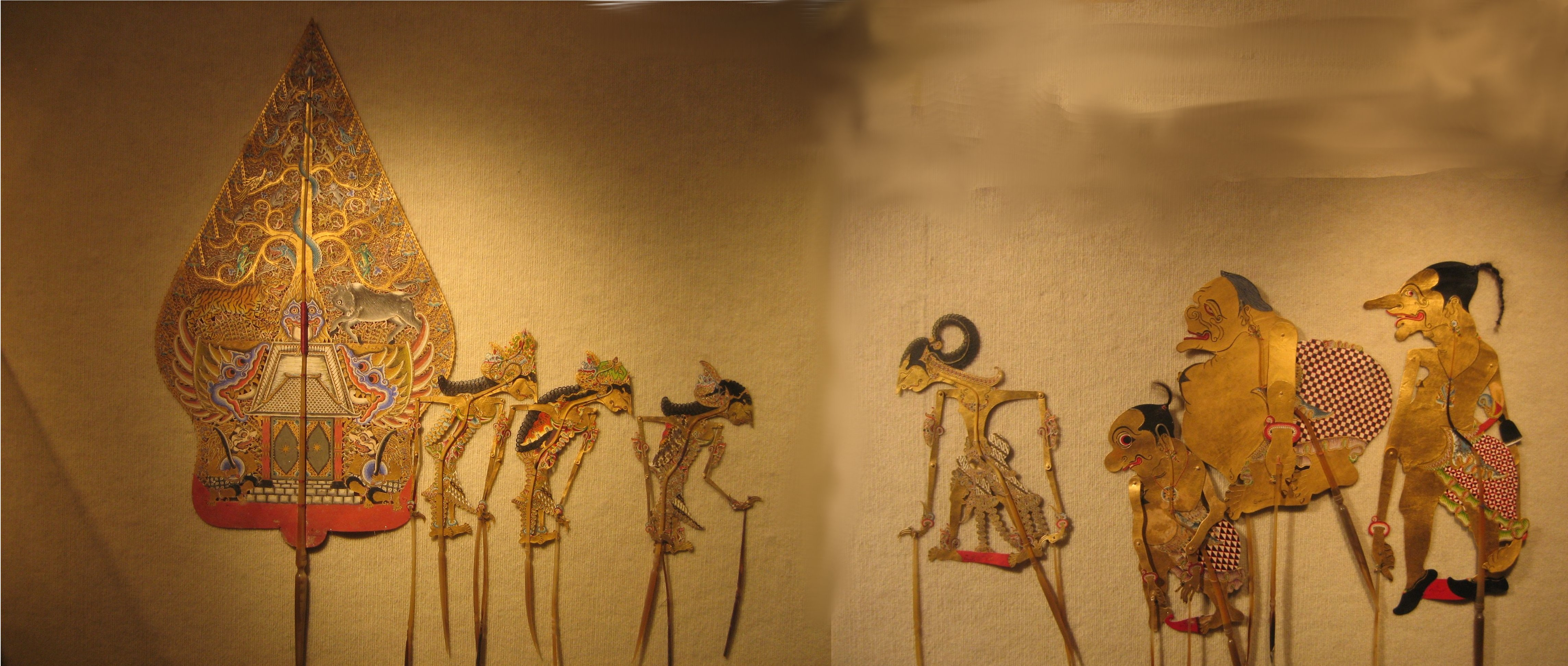
Wayang (shadow puppets) from central Java, a scene from Irawan's Wedding, mid-20th century, University of Hawaii Dept. of Theater and Dance.

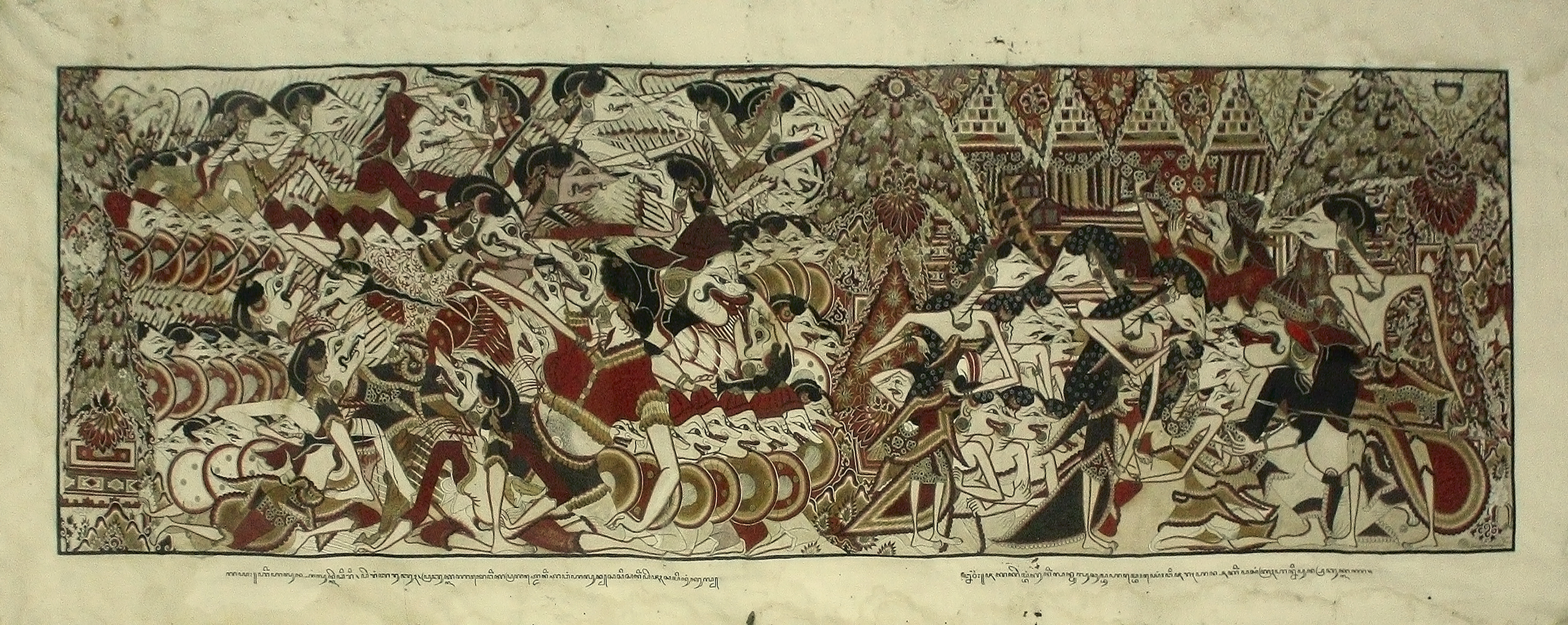
Wayang beber depiction of a battle.

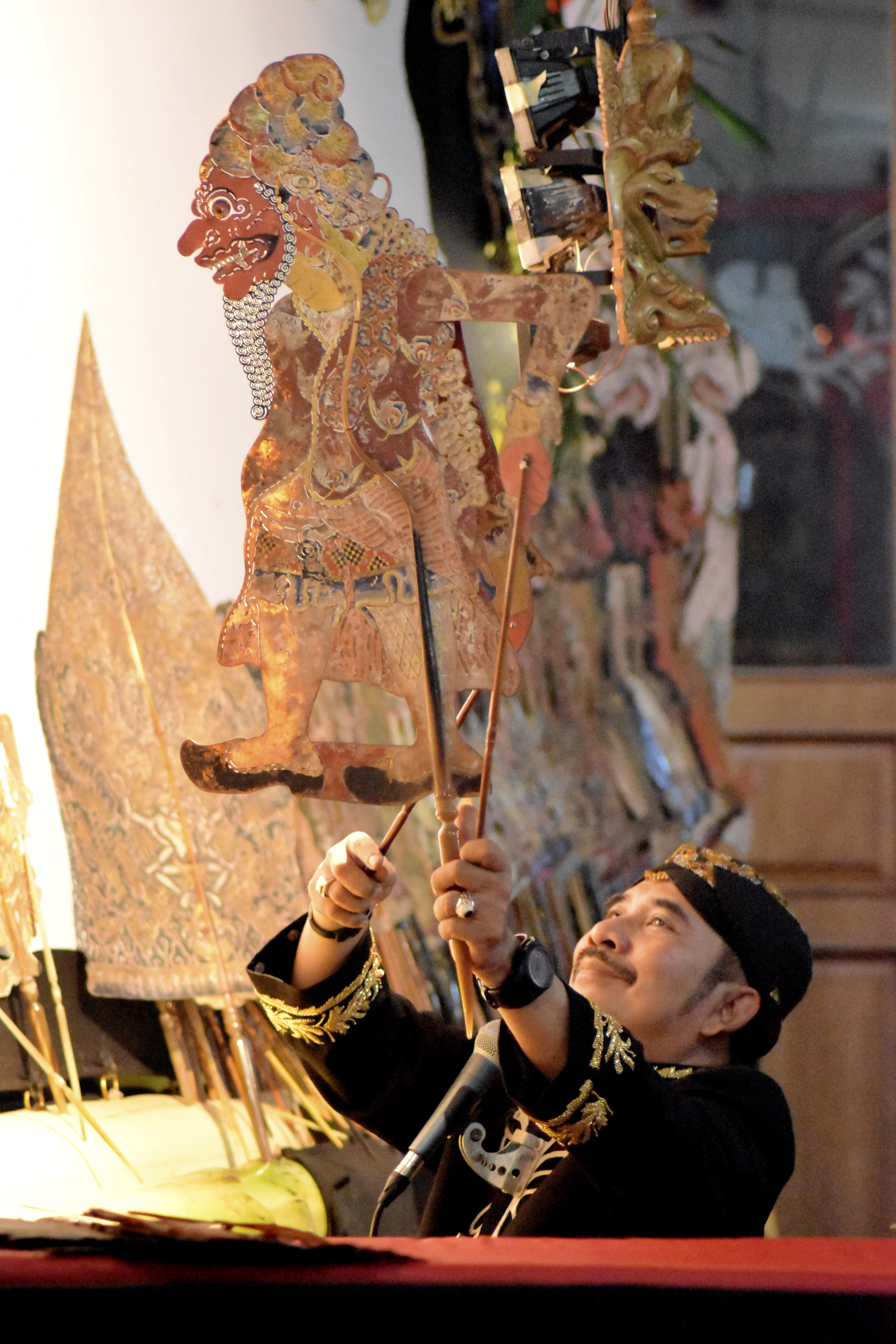
Wayang kulit and wayang golek dalang (puppeteer), Ki Entus Susmono.

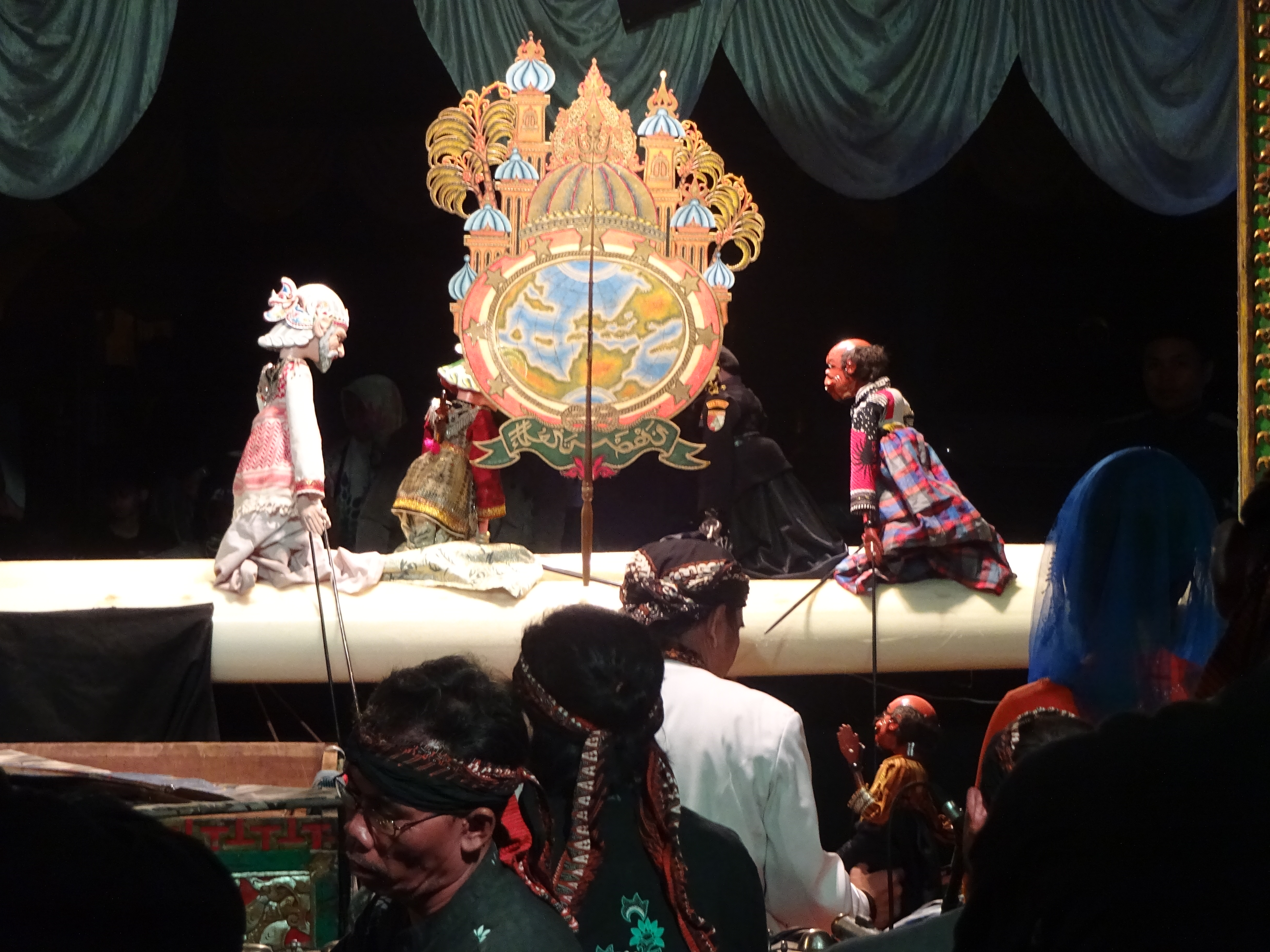
Wayang golek performance in Yogyakarta.

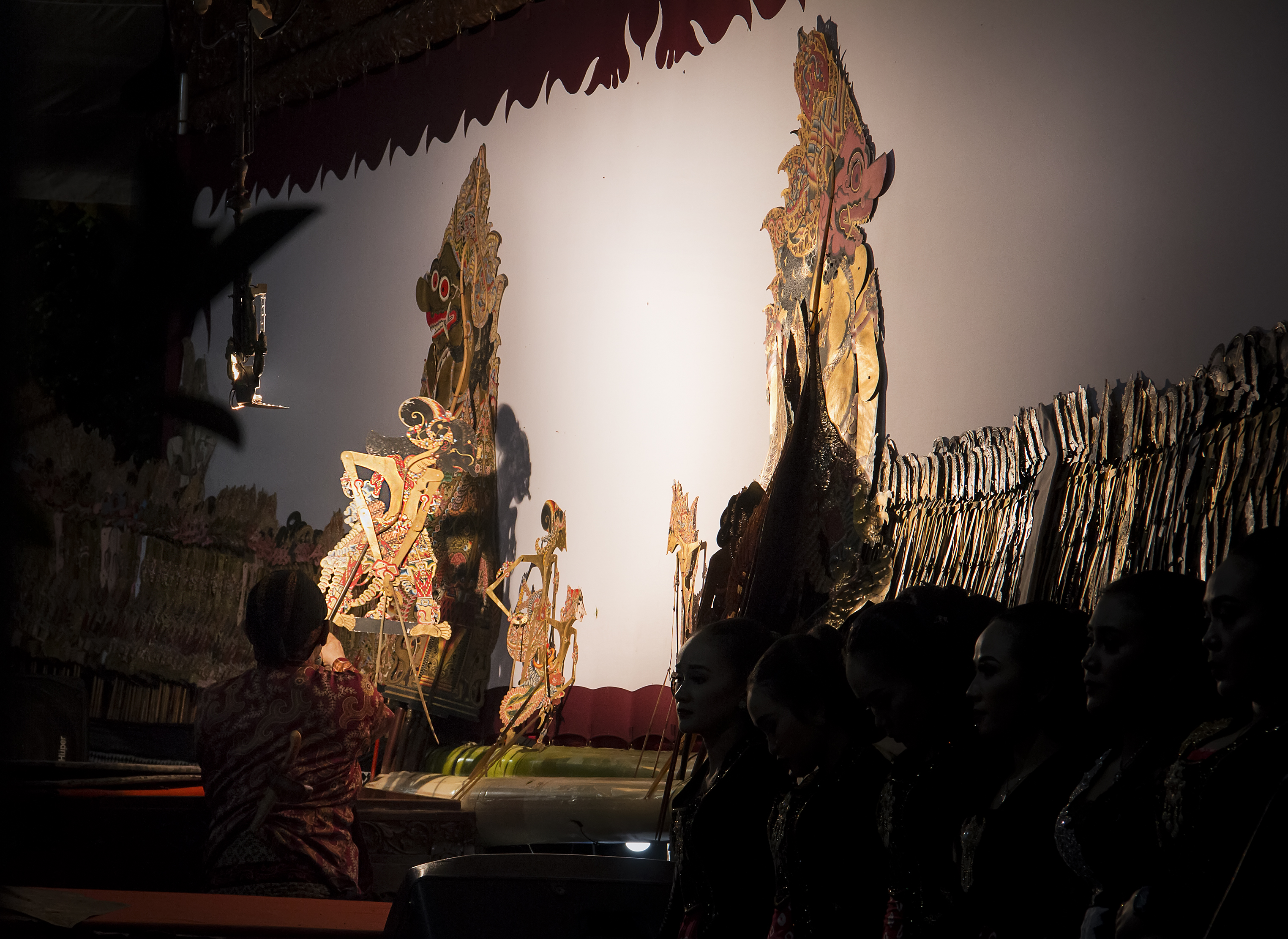
Wayang kulit (leather shadow puppet) performance.

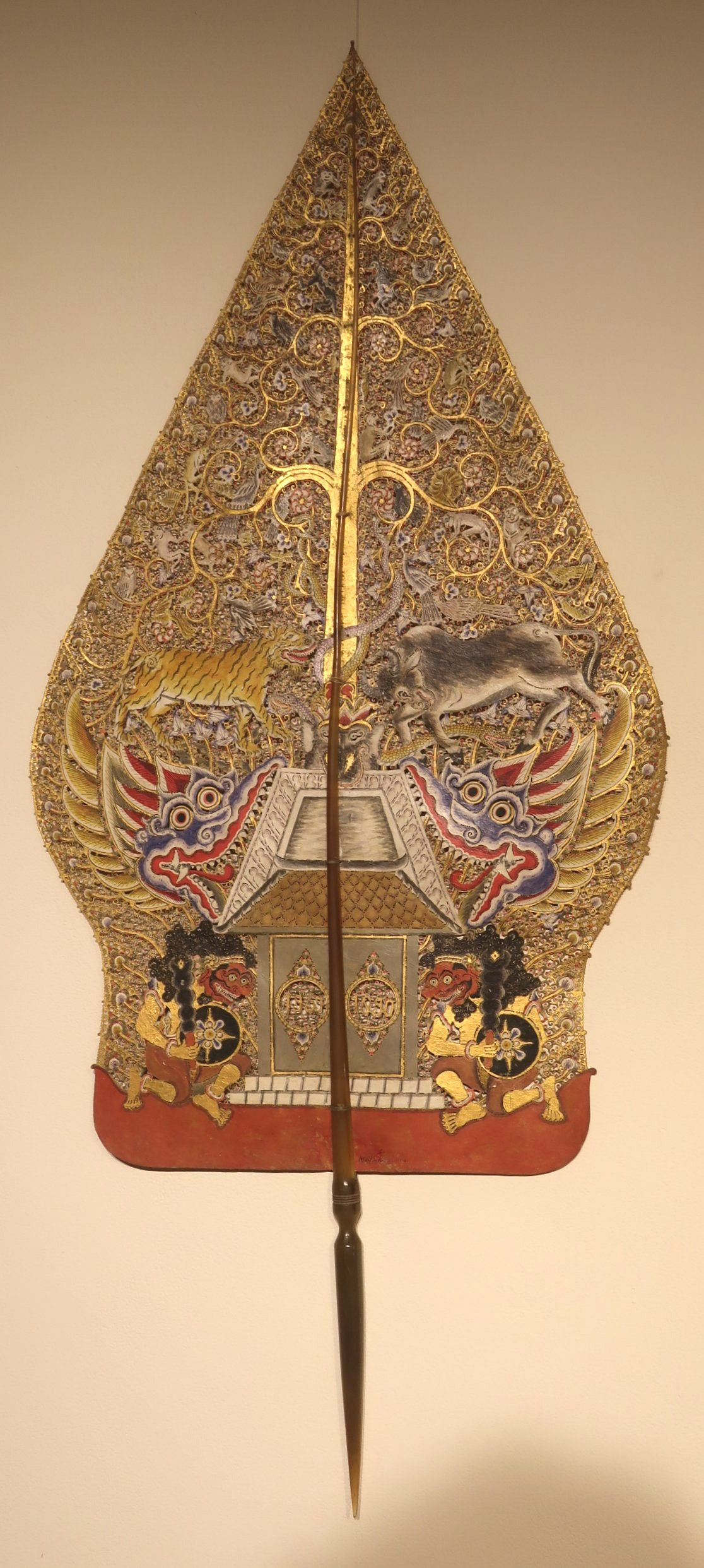
Kayon (Gunungan).

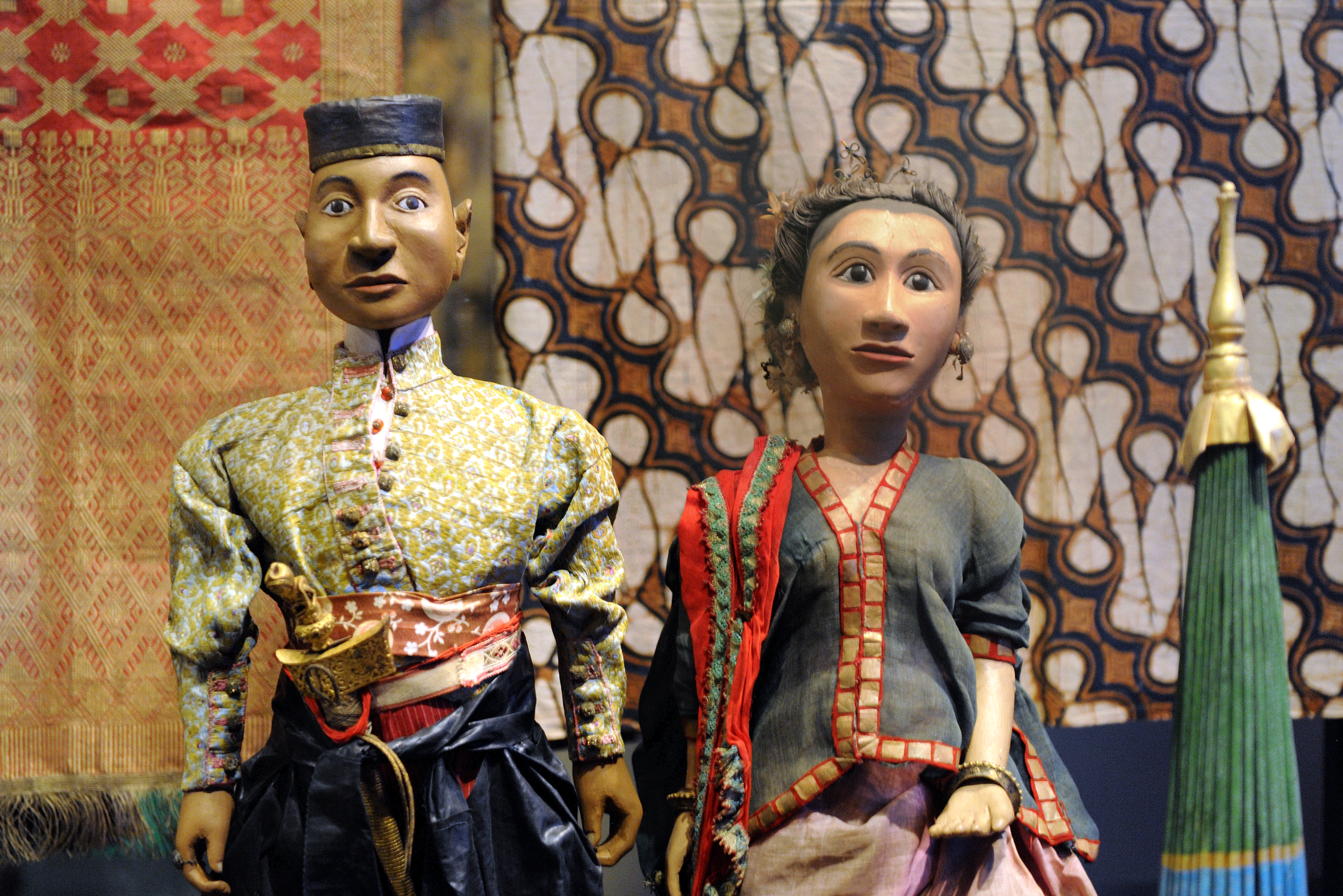
Wayang makassar

== See also ==
- Culture of Indonesia
- Garuda wisnu kencena
- Javanese culture
