= List of Indonesian deities =

Indonesia is home to over 600 ethnic groups, some who have their own belief system and mythology. The following is a list of Indonesian deities.

== Balinese ==
- Acintya - Supreme God
- Batara Kala - god of the underworld
- Dewi Danu - goddess of the lakes
- Dewi Ratih - goddess of the moon
- Dewi Sri - goddess of rice and prosperity

== Dayak ==
- Jubata

== Javanese ==
- Batara Guru - avatar of Hindu god Shiva and ruler of the Kahyangan, god of revelations
- Batara Sambu - god of teachers
- Batara Kala - god of the underworld
- Dewi Lanjar - goddess who rules the North Sea
- Dewi Ratih - goddess of the moon
- Dewi Sri - goddess of rice and prosperity
- Nyai Roro Kidul - goddess who rules the South Sea (Indian Ocean)
- Batara Bayu - God of wind

== Kombai ==
- Refafu - god of the rainforest

== Moluccans ==
- Hainuwele - goddess who gives origin to vegetable crops

== Sundanese ==
- Nyai Pohaci Sanghyang Asri - goddess of rice and prosperity
- Sunan Ambu - mother goddess

== Toraja ==
- Puang Matua - creator god
- Pong Banggai di Rante - god of Earth
- Indo' Ongon-Ongon - goddess of earthquakes
- Pong Lalondong - god of death
- Indo' Belo Tumbang - goddess of medicine

== See also ==
- Hyang, various gods and spirits
- Hinduism in Indonesia
- Sunda Wiwitan
- Kejawen
