= Indonesian League (badminton) =

- Sport: Badminton
- Founded: 2007
- Country: Indonesia
- Continent: Asia

The Indonesian League in badminton is a team competition established in 2007 and held in Indonesia.

The total prize will be around US$98,000.

== History ==
This league has been conceptualized since 2003, but until four years later it had not become real due to the numerous obstacles.

The first competition was held for 10 days in Jakarta beginning June 21, 2007.

== Format ==
The competition involves eight Indonesian clubs in the final rounds, with a format similar to the Thomas and Uber Cup. The five best clubs will qualify for the final, and qualifying rounds will be competitions for the other three places.

== The teams ==
Ten men's teams from ten clubs had a qualification round. The teams selected were:

- Indocafe, Medan
- Ratih, Banten
- Aufa, Jakarta
- Musica Champion, Kudus
- BPKD, Kukar
- Wima, Surabaya
- Mutiara, Bandung
- Kotab Dishub, Bandung
- South Suco, South Sulawesi
- Randik, South Sumatra

Seven women's teams from seven clubs had a qualification round. The teams selected were:

- Indocafe, Medan
- Ratih, Banten
- Bina Bangsa, Jakarta
- Semen Gresik, Surabaya
- Mutiara, Bandung
- Kotab Dishub, Bandung
- South Suco, South Sulawesi

Another five teams (men's teams and a women's team) had a bye to the grand final round. The teams were:

- Djarum, Kudus
- Jayaraya, Jakarta
- Suryanaga Gudang Garam, Surabaya
- Tangkas, Jakarta
- SGS Elektrik, Bandung

== Grand Final round ==
After qualification, three teams from the men's and women's division took their place in a grand final round. From the men's division, the Musica Champion, Mutiara and Ratih teams won a ticket to the grand final round. And from the women's division, the Mutiara, Bina Bangsa and Ratih teams won a ticket for a match in the grand final round.

And at the last round, the Suryanaga Gudang Garam team won the men's team competition after beating the Tangkas team. From women's team competition, Tangkas was a surprise champion after defeating the first seed team, Jayaraya.

== Men's team semifinal ==
Suryanaga Gudang Garam ( 3–0 ) Tangkas

- the winner of the match in bold

Category	Suryanaga Gudang Garam	Tangkas	Score
First match (singles)	(China) **Chen Hong**	(Indonesia) Simon Santoso	21–17, 21–16
Second match (doubles)	(Indonesia) **Tri Kusharjanto** & **Alvent Yulianto**	(Hong Kong) Yohan Hadikusumo Wiratama & Albertus Susanto Njoto	15–21, 21–18, 21–11
Third match (singles)	(Indonesia) **Sony Dwi Kuncoro**	(Indonesia) Alamsyah Yunus	21–15, 21–18

== Women's team grand final ==
Tangkas ( 3–2 ) Jayaraya

- the winner of the match in bold

Category	Tangkas	Jayaraya	Score
First match (singles)	(Hong Kong) **Wang Chen**	(Indonesia) Adriyanti Firdasari	21–19, 22–20
Second match (singles)	(Hong Kong) **Yip Pui Yin**	(Indonesia) Pia Zebadiah Bernadet	21–23, 21–15, 21–14
Third match (doubles)	(Indonesia) Jo Novita & Endang Nursugianti	(Indonesia) **Greysia Polii** & **Rani Mundiasti**	20–22, 21–6, 5–21
Fourth match (singles)	(Indonesia) Yuan Kartika Putri	(Indonesia) **Fransisca Ratnasari**	13–21, 18–21
Fifth match (doubles)	(Indonesia) **Liliyana Natsir** & **Vita Marissa**	(Indonesia) Nitya Krishinda Maheswari & Pia Zebadiah Bernadet	21–13, 21–17
