= Batara =

Batara may refer to:

- Batara, term for gods (devas) in Indonesian Hinduism from Sanskrit bhattaraka, cf. Batara Guru, Batara Sambu, Batara Kala
- Batara, Laclubar, a suco in Laclubar administrative post, Manatuto municipality, Timor-Leste
- Batara, Nepal
- Batara (bird), a monotypic bird genus containing only the giant antshrike
- Savo Lazarević nicknamed Batara (1849—1943), Montenegrin and Yugoslav military officer
