= Antaboga =

Serpent deity in Javanism and Sundanism

Antaḅoga; Antabhoga
- King of Worldly Serpents
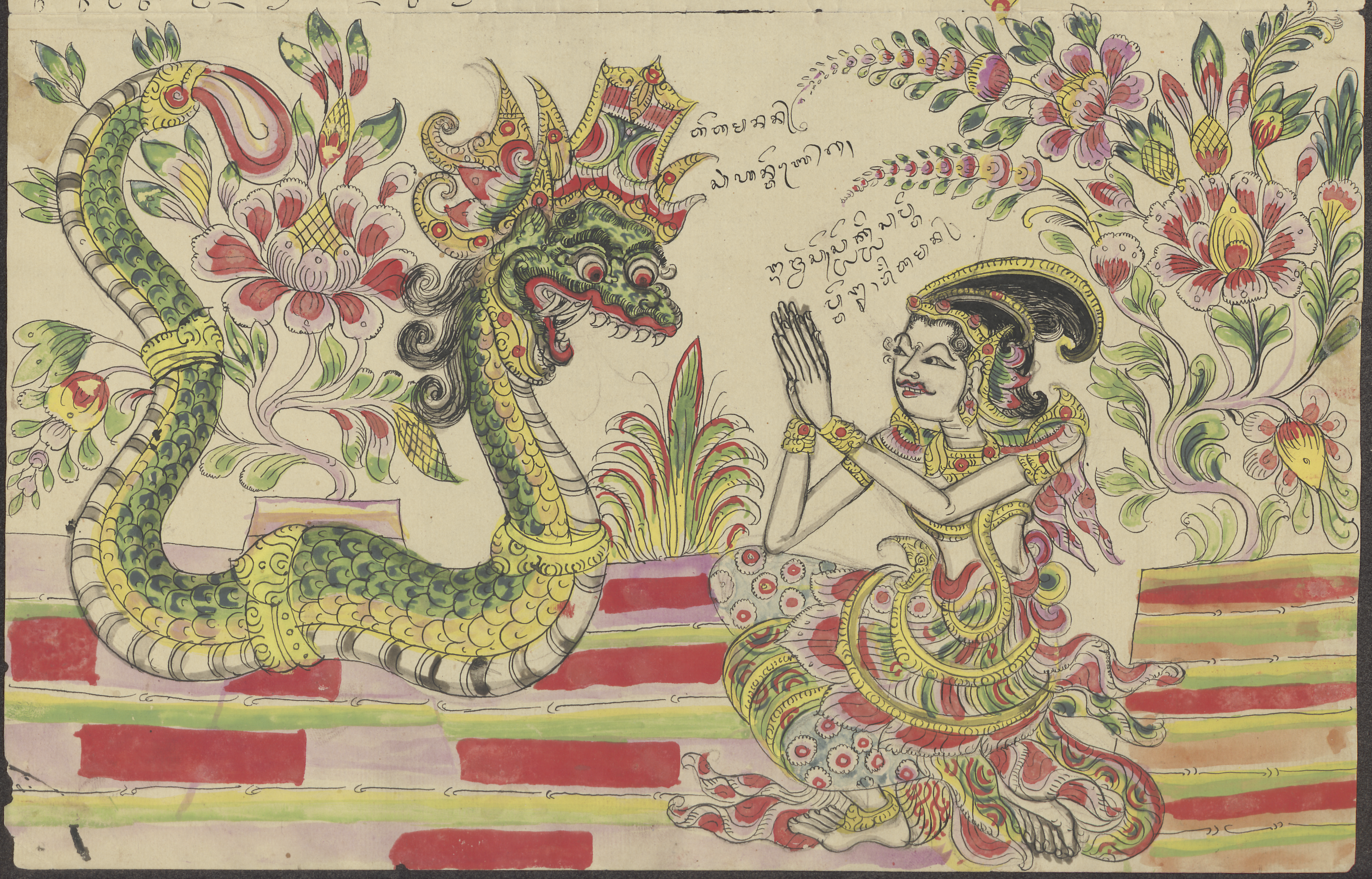
- A 19th century Balinese-style drawing by I Ketut Gedé, depicting a Balinese man named Juarsa worshipping Antaboga.
- Other names: Anantabhoga (in Kawi)
- Javan-Bali scripts: Javanese: ꦄꦤ꧀ꦠꦨꦺꦴꦒ; Sundanese: ᮃᮔ᮪ᮒᮽᮧᮌ; Balinese: ᬅᬦ᭄ᬢᬪᭀᬕ
- Venerated in: Javanism, Sundanism, Balinese Hinduism
- Texts: Wawacan Sulanjana; Tantu Pagelaran

Antaboga (from Kawi Anantabhoga; Javanese: ꦄꦤ꧀ꦠꦨꦺꦴꦒ; Sundanese: ᮃᮔ᮪ᮒᮽᮧᮌ; Balinese: ᬅᬦ᭄ᬢᬪᭀᬕ), or colloquially also known as the Javan Dragon Snake deity is a serpent deity in Javanism and Sundanism (later also adopted in Balinese Hinduism).

== Nomenclature ==
Antaboga is a Javanese-origin name, derived or inherited from Anantabhoga in Old Javanese meaning lit. 'endless food'. According to the Balinese literatures, the term might possibly rooted from two Sanskrit words, namely Āṉanta (अनन्त, lit. 'infinite') and Bhoga (भोग, lit. 'to enjoy, to benefit'). In Hindu traditions, he is identified with Sheshanaga.

== Mythology ==
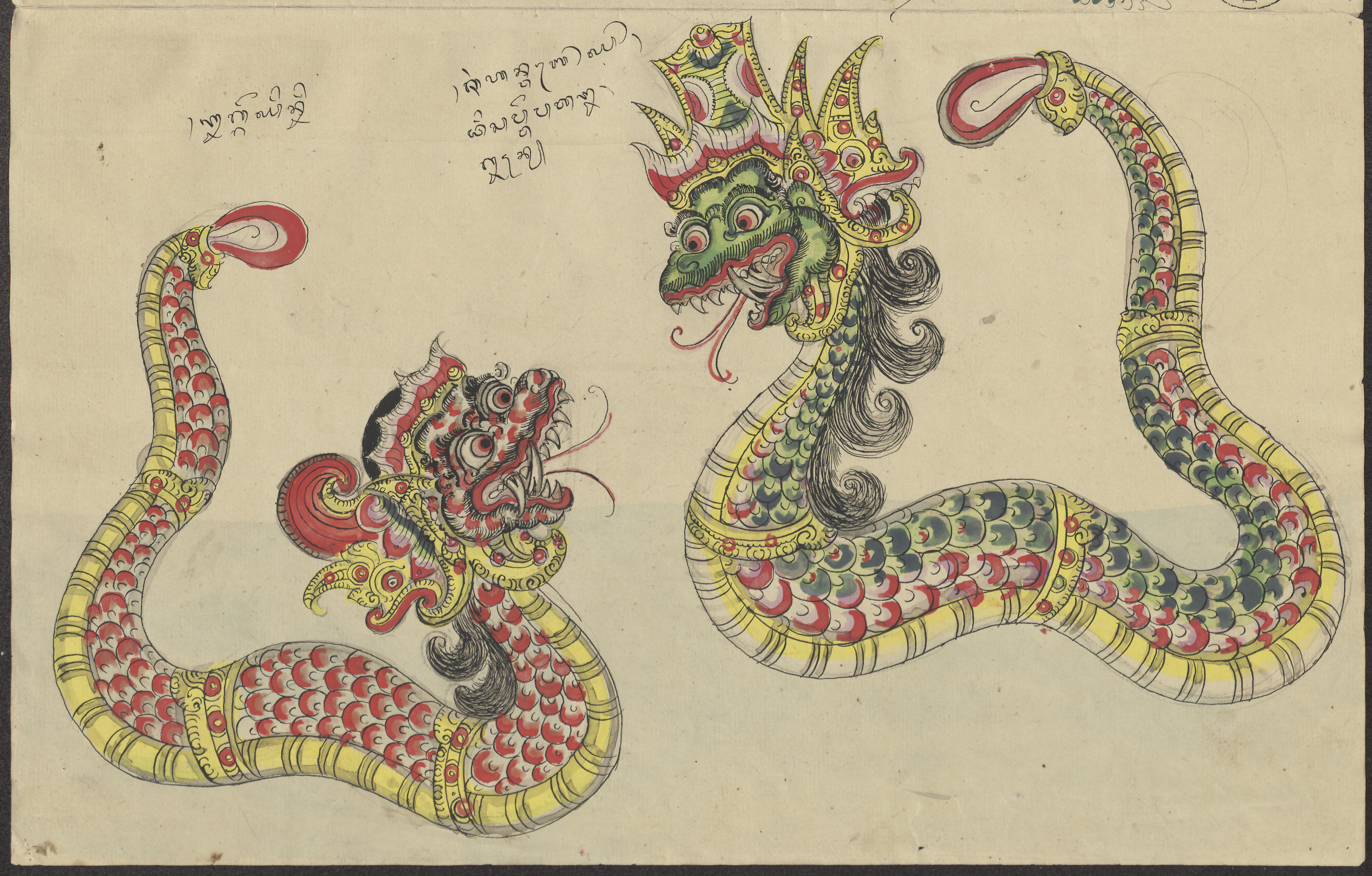
Nagagini speaks to her father Antaboga

At the beginning of time, only Antaboga existed. Antaboga meditated and created the world turtle named Bedawang from which all other creations sprang. In Javanese and Balinese mythology, Antaboga has two offsprings, a male named Bambang Naga Tatmala and a female one named Dewi Nagagini.

According to Sundanese myth, Antaboga was also responsible for the birth of Dewi Sri, the rice goddess of Java and Bali. According to Wawacan Sulanjana, Dewi Sri emerges from the tears that turned into an egg, shed by Antaboga.

These days many of the old myths and legends are celebrated in the wayang performance that became a vehicle to combine the syncretic philosophies from outside with those philosophies and ideas already rooted within the local cultures and traditions.

== Depictions ==
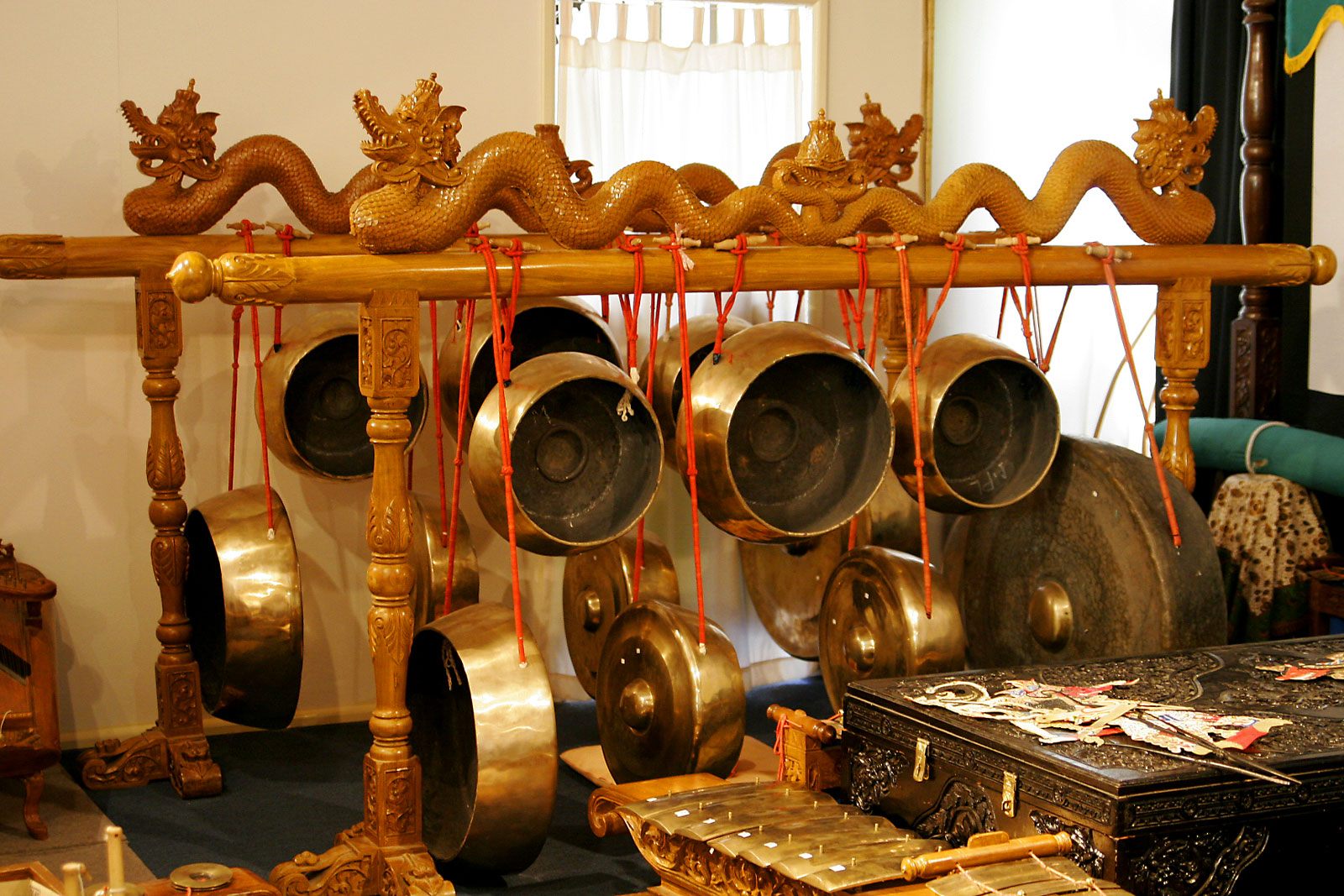
Antaboga depicted as a crowned serpent deity decorating a gong in Javanese gamelan set

In Javanese art, Antaboga is often depicted as a crowned serpent. As a divine serpent symbolism, it is applied into ornaments and decorative carvings. Generally it will appear on gong decorations as a symbol of the Javanese dragon. Artefacts of ancient objects are also generally decorated with Javanese dragon figures, such as keris, temple doors, stairs railings and other Javanese ornaments.

Antaboga is possibly derived from the actual native Javan dragon snake (Xenodermus javanicus), originally and traditionally venerated in Javanism folk religious belief, widely practiced by the local Javanese since pre-Islamic era (before the Islamization of Demak Kingdom, which later transformed as Demak Sultanate).
