= Hypsiscopus matannensis =

Scientific classification
- Kingdom: Animalia
- Phylum: Chordata
- Class: Reptilia
- Order: Squamata
- Suborder: Serpentes
- Family: Homalopsidae
- Genus: Hypsiscopus
- Species: H. matannensis

Binomial name
- Hypsiscopus matannensis (Boulenger 1897)

Synonyms
- Enhydris matannensis; Hypsirhina matannensis (Basionym)

Species of water snake

Hypsiscopus matannensis is a species of water snake in the order Squamata. The species epithet refers to its type locality, Lake Matana (also spelled Matano), in Sulawesi. Its common names are Matana mud or water snake, which also reflects its type locality, and Boulenger's water snake. The species was first described in 1897 by the zoologist George Albert Boulenger.

It is endemic to Southeast Sulawesi (the Celebes).
