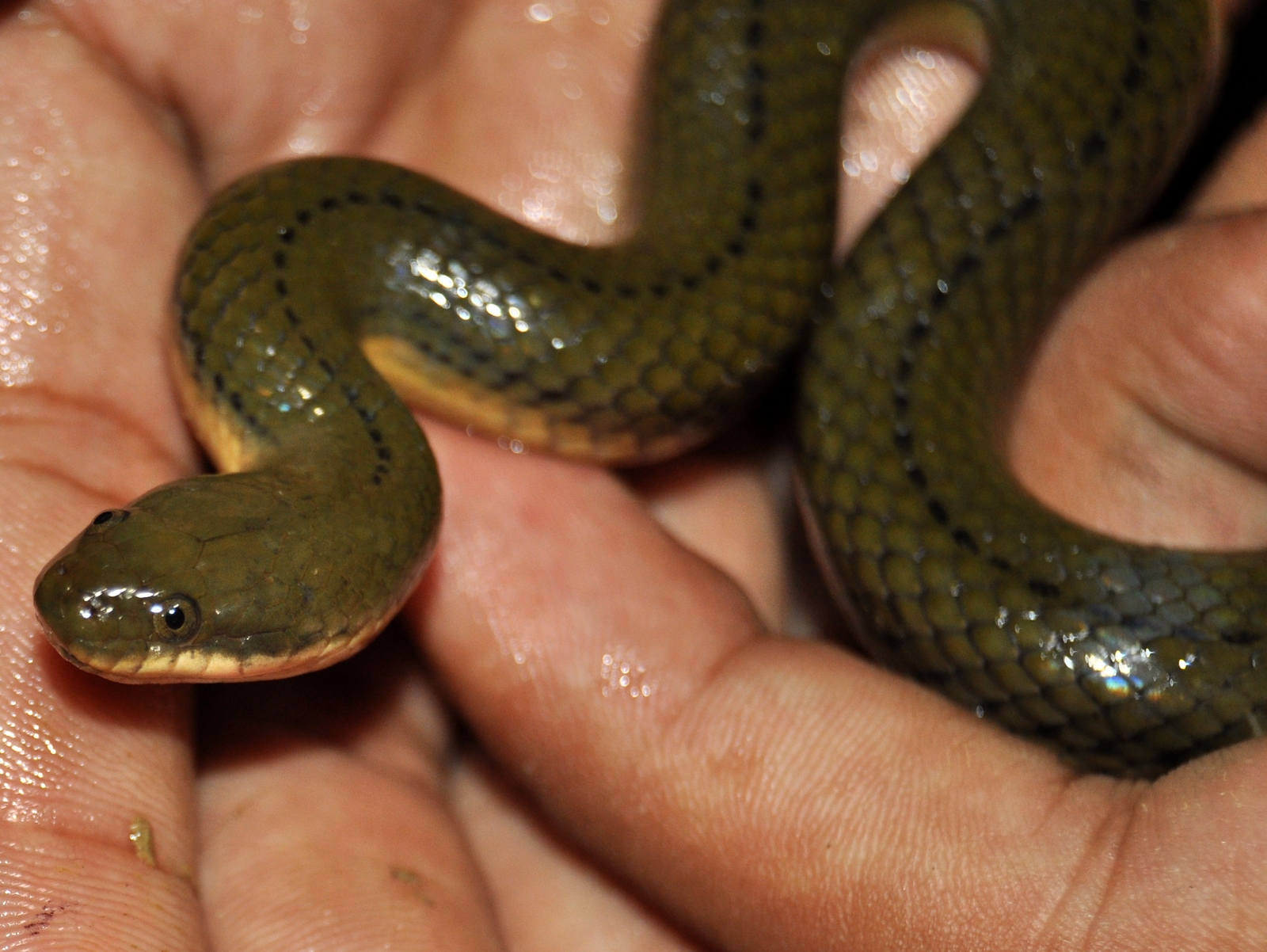
- Hypsiscopus plumbea

Scientific classification
- Kingdom: Animalia
- Phylum: Chordata
- Class: Reptilia
- Order: Squamata
- Suborder: Serpentes
- Family: Homalopsidae
- Genus: Hypsiscopus; Fitzinger, 1843

Species
- 2 (see text)

= Hypsiscopus =

Genus of snakes

Hypsiscopus is a genus of snakes of the family Homalopsidae. The name comes from the Greek words Hypsi, meaning high or lofty, and scopus, meaning view, and refers to the location of the eyes, which are set high on the heads of these snakes.

== Species ==
There are three recognized species:

- Hypsiscopus matannensis (Boulenger, 1897)
- Hypsiscopus plumbea (Boie, 1827)
- Hypsiscopus murphyi (Bernstein et al., 2022)
