= Pura Beji Sangsit =

Hindu temple in Bali, Indonesia

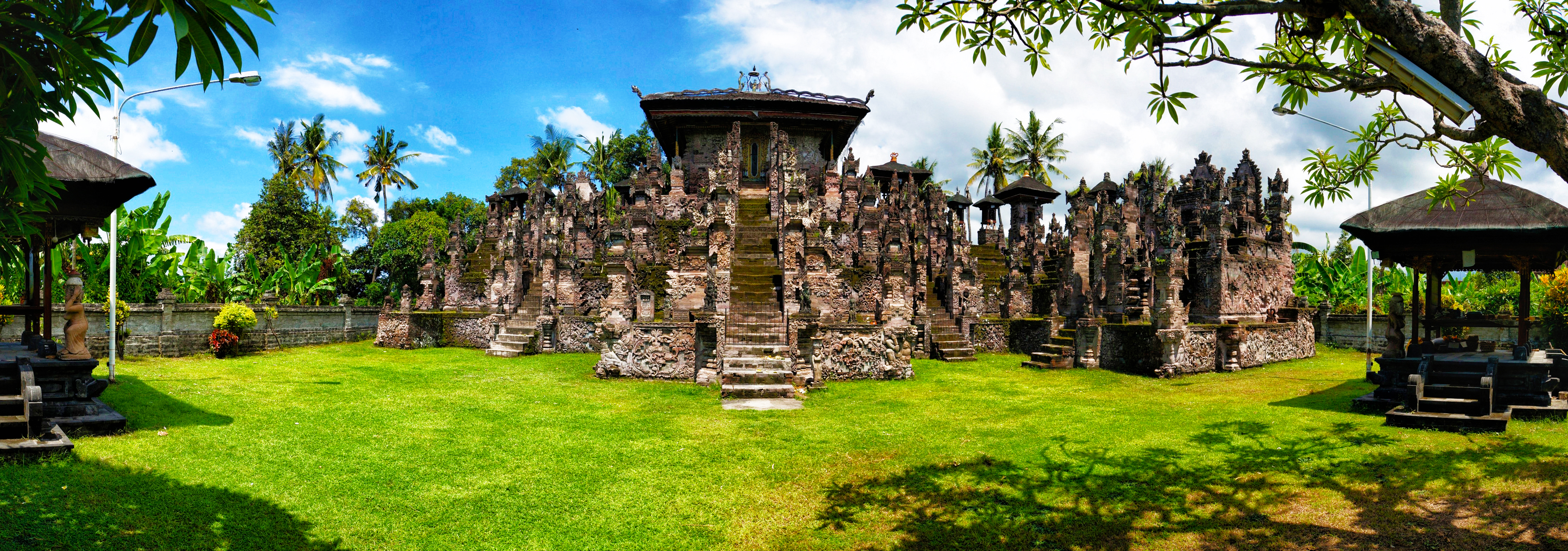
- Pura Baji of Sangsit, a pura built in North Balinese style.
- Interactive map of the Pura Beji Sangsit area

General information
- Type: Pura
- Architectural style: Balinese
- Location: Sangsit, Buleleng, Bali, Indonesia, Jalan Raya Sangsit, Sangsit, Sawan, Kabupaten Buleleng, Bali 81171
- Coordinates: 8°05′01″S 115°08′03″E
- Estimated completion: 15th-century

Design and construction
- Architect: Truna Pesaren

Pura Beji Sangsit is a Balinese temple or pura located in Sangsit, Buleleng, on the island of Bali, Indonesia. The village of Sangsit is located around 8 kilometres (5.0 miles) east of Singaraja. Pura Beji is dedicated to the rice goddess Dewi Sri, and is revered especially by the farmers around the area. Pura Beji is an example of a stereotypical northern Balinese architecture with its relatively heavier decorations than it is southern Balinese counterpart, and its typical foliage-like carvings.

== History ==
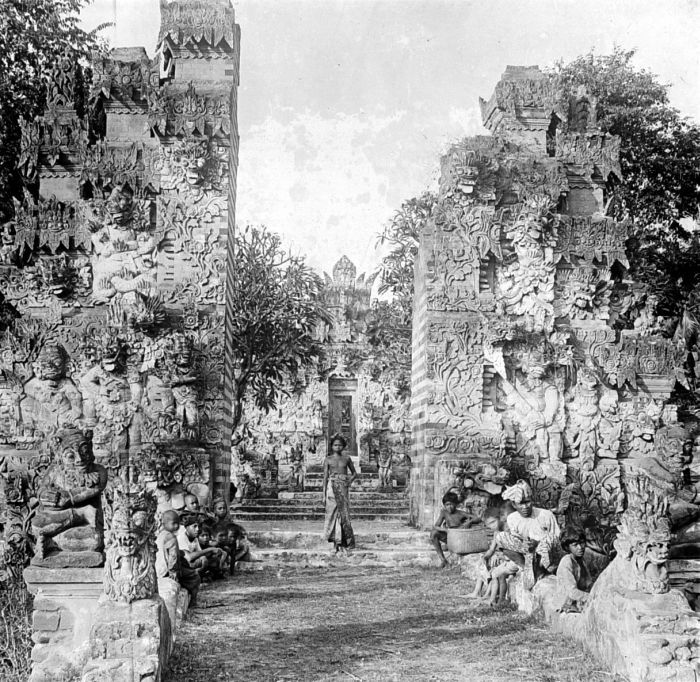
The damaged candi bentar split gate of Pura Beji in the early 20th-century.

Pura Beji dates back from the 15th century, during the time of the arrival of Brahmins to Bali from the Hindu Majapahit Kingdom of Java. At that time, the village of Sangsit was known as Beji. Pura Beji was constructed during the reign of Pasek Sakti Batu Lepang in north Bali. The architect and maintainer (pengempon) of Pura Beji was Truna Pesaren.

The word Beji has the same meaning with the Balinese temple pond, similar with one in Pura Tirta Empul. This associates Pura Beji with purification by way of holy water. In fact, a former pond supposedly fed by an ancient well has been discovered on the east side of Pura Beji. Because of its association with a water source, the farmers around the village of Sangsit revered Pura Beji as "pura subak", subak is a term for the Balinese paddy irrigation system which was introduced in 1074 during the reign of Marakata. Because of this, the temple is also known as Pura Subak Beji, and is highly revered by the farmers who honored it in return to the fertility of their rice paddy.

Pura Beji has been restored several times. A 20th-century photograph shows damage on the candi bentar split gate of the Pura Beji. The temple's restoration is done carefully by maintaining the original style back into the temple.

== Temple compound ==
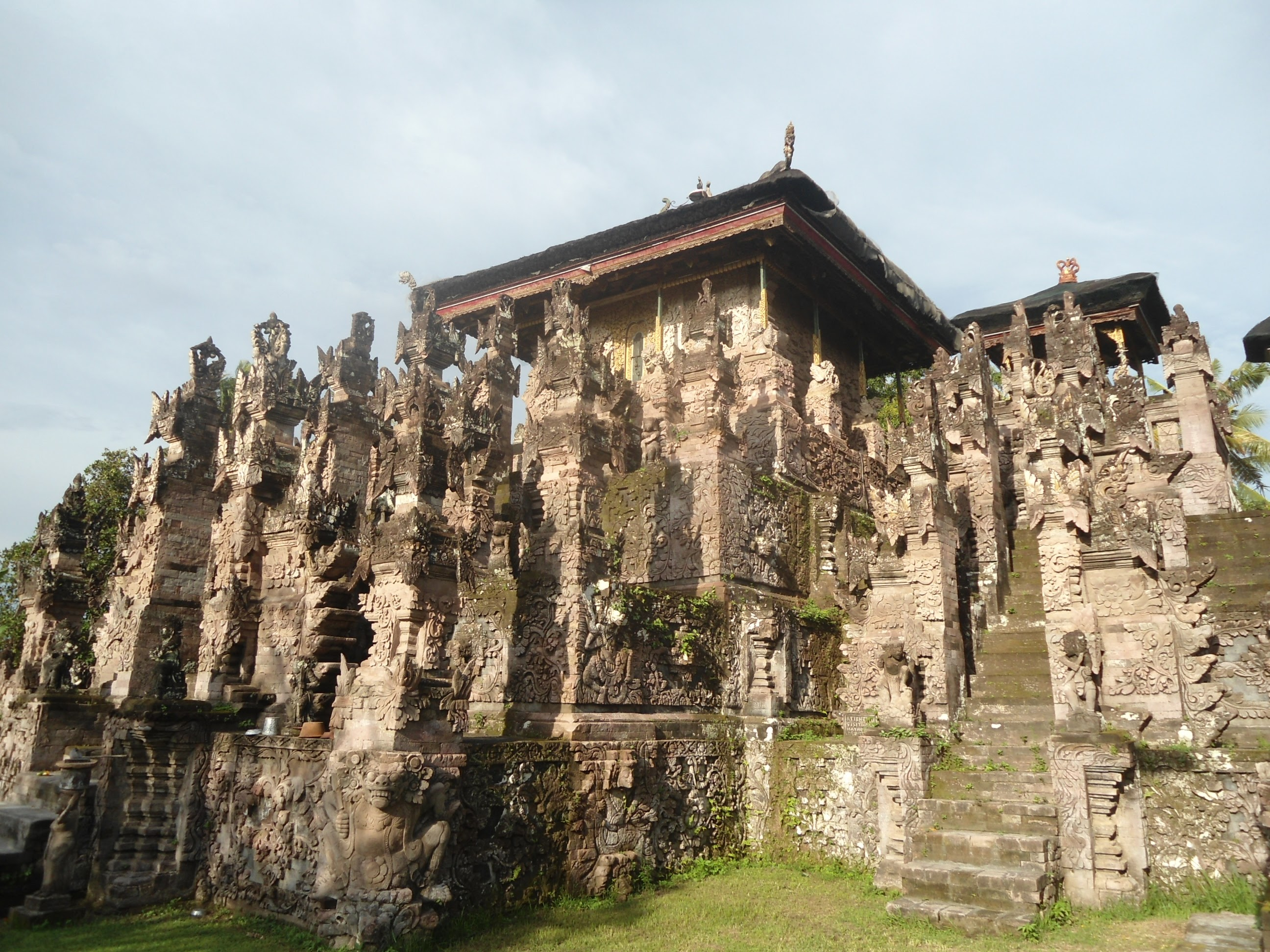
The main shrine of Pura Beji with its heavy plant-like ornaments.

Pura Beji is built in the style typical of northern Bali. Shrine bases and the white sandstone walls surrounding the temple are covered in foliage-like carvings e.g. vine motifs or figures of flowers, a feature that can only be found in northern Bali. Traces of colors have been discovered in these carvings, which indicate that the temple have been painted. Intact statues of demons and guardian nagas inspired by Hindu epics decorate the stone staircases and the walls.

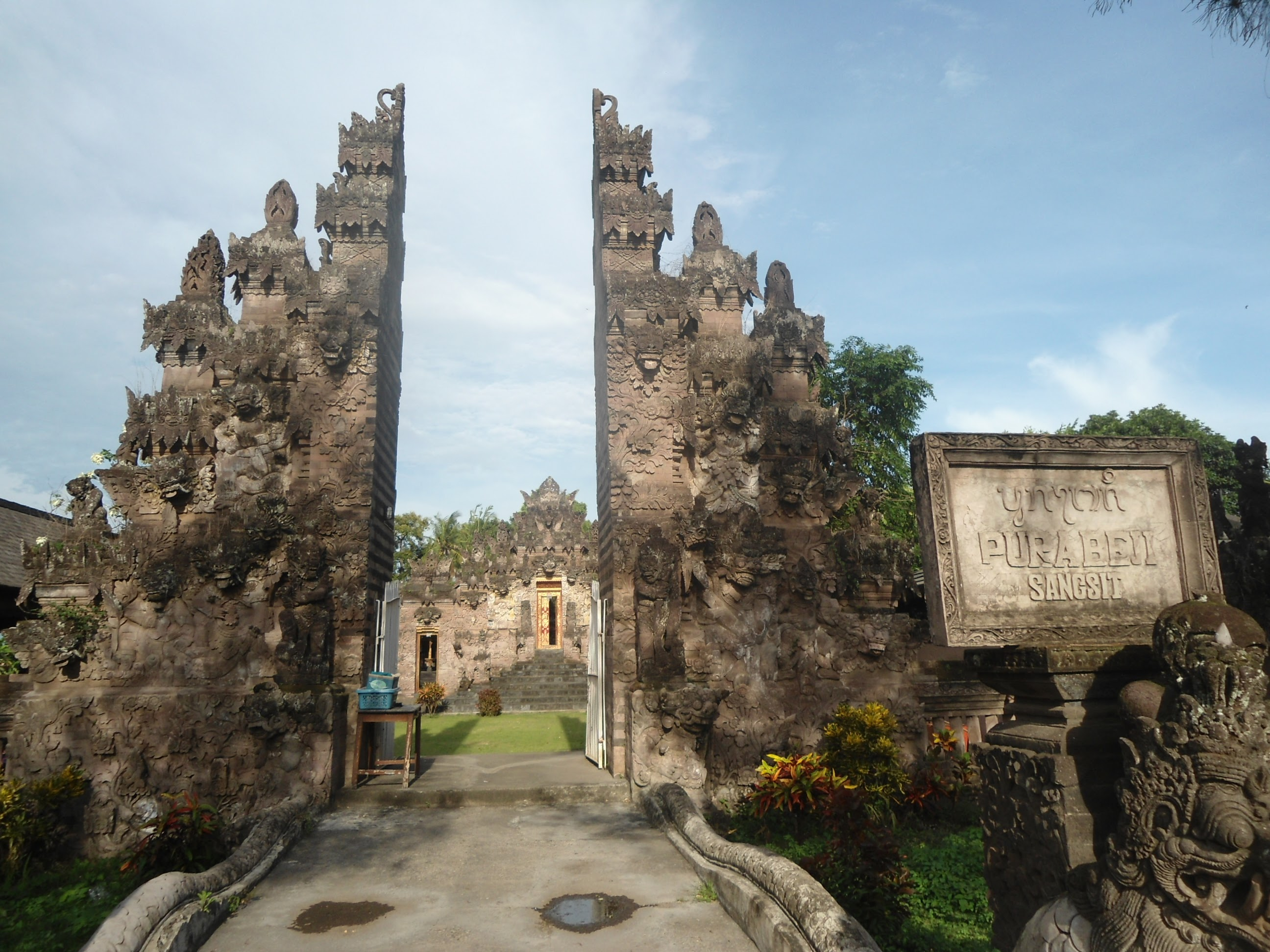
Beji Temple entrance.

Pura Beji is divided into three areas: the outer sanctum of the temple (jaba pisan or nistaning mandala), the middle sanctum (jaba tengah or madya mandala), and the inner main sanctum (jero or utamaning mandala).

In the outer sanctum is the bale kulkul where the slit-log drum is kept to announce the time for prayer. The bale kulkul of Pura Beji is unusually lacking plant-like carvings and is relatively bare compared with the other architectural elements of Pura Beji, which indicates that the bale kulkul was built later in period and probably by a non-Northern Balinese sculptor.

Access to the middle sanctum is provided by a candi bentar split gate. This candi bentar is carved with heavy decorations of plants and flowers in northern Balinese style. Multiple bhoma heads are carved on the top of the candi bentar, providing extra protection to the temple against evil spirits. In the middle sanctum are several pavilions or bale.

Access to the inner sanctum or the jero is provided with a large paduraksa portal. The portal is heavily decorated with carvings of vines and flowers typical northern Bali style. The top of the paduraksa is carved with multiple Bhoma heads, a kind of Balinese Kirtimukha protectors of the temple. A unique feature of the Pura Beji is that the aling-aling (a kind of barrier structure to deflect evil spirits) is carved with a figure of two Dutchmen playing stringed instruments, flanking a figure of Naga. The main shrine in the form of pelinggih is located in the inner sanctum, dedicated to Sang Hyang Widhi. Other deities honored in the temple are Dewa Braban, Dewa Ayu Manik Galih, and Dewi Sri.

== See also ==
- Balinese temples
