= Rice goddess =

Rice goddess may refer to:

- Dewi Sri in Sundanese, Javanese and Balinese culture.
- Phosop in Thai culture (Lao Khosop, Khmer Po Ino Nogar).
- Inari Ōkami in Japanese culture.
