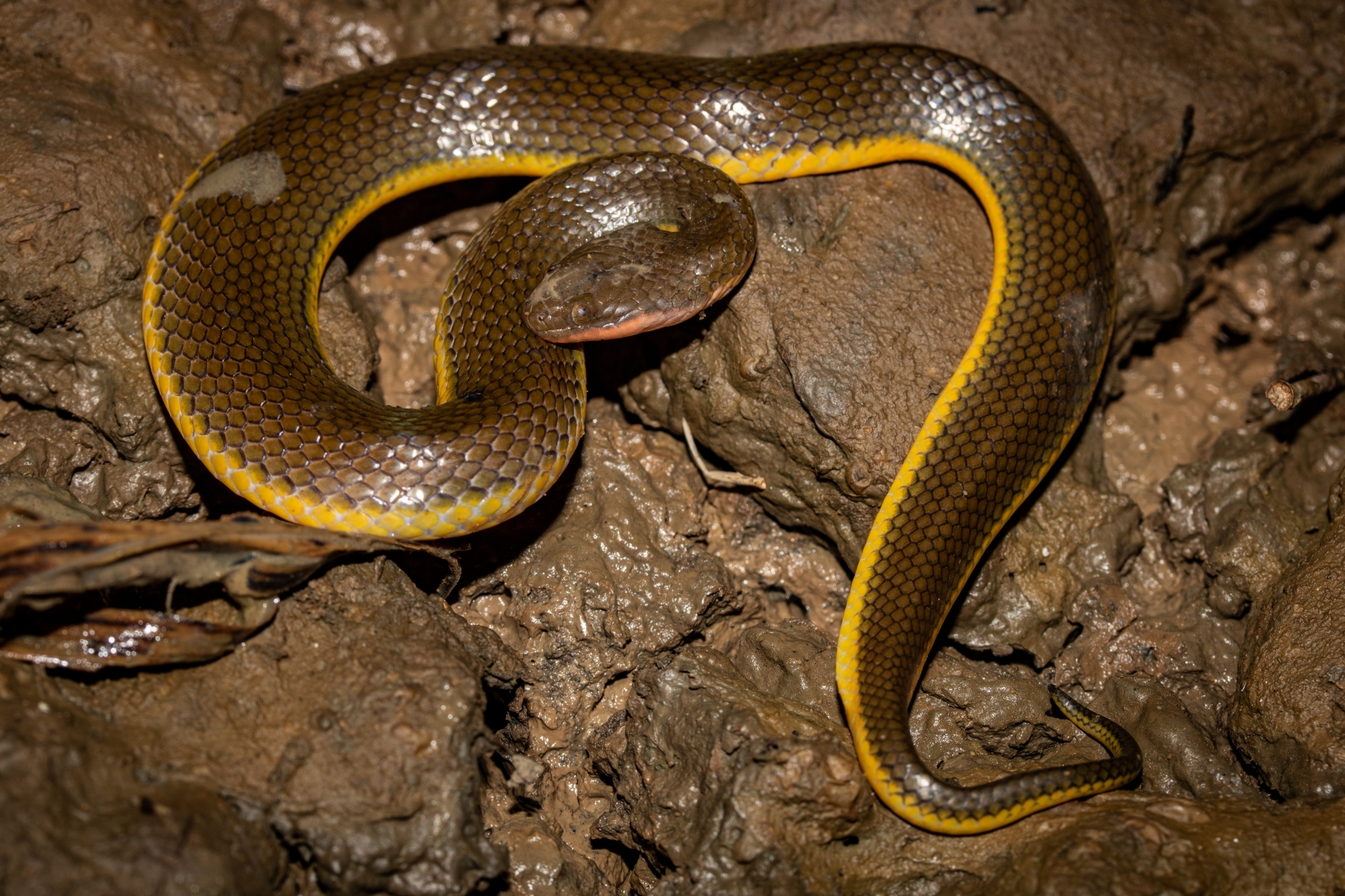

Scientific classification
- Domain: Eukaryota
- Kingdom: Animalia
- Phylum: Chordata
- Class: Reptilia
- Order: Squamata
- Suborder: Serpentes
- Family: Homalopsidae
- Genus: Hypsiscopus
- Species: H. murphyi

Binomial name
- Hypsiscopus murphyi (Bernstein et al., 2022)

= Hypsiscopus murphyi =

Species of snake

Hypsiscopus murphyi, commonly known as Murphy's mud snake, is species of snake in the family Homalopsidae. It's specific epithet is named after the herpetologist John C. Murphy.

A 2024 morphological study concluded that Hypsiscopus murphyi is a junior synonym of Hypsiscopus wettsteini after revalidating the latter.

== Distribution ==
Laos (Khammouan), SE China (Hong Kong, Hainan, Fujian, Yunnan), Taiwan, Vietnam, Laos, Cambodia, Thailand.

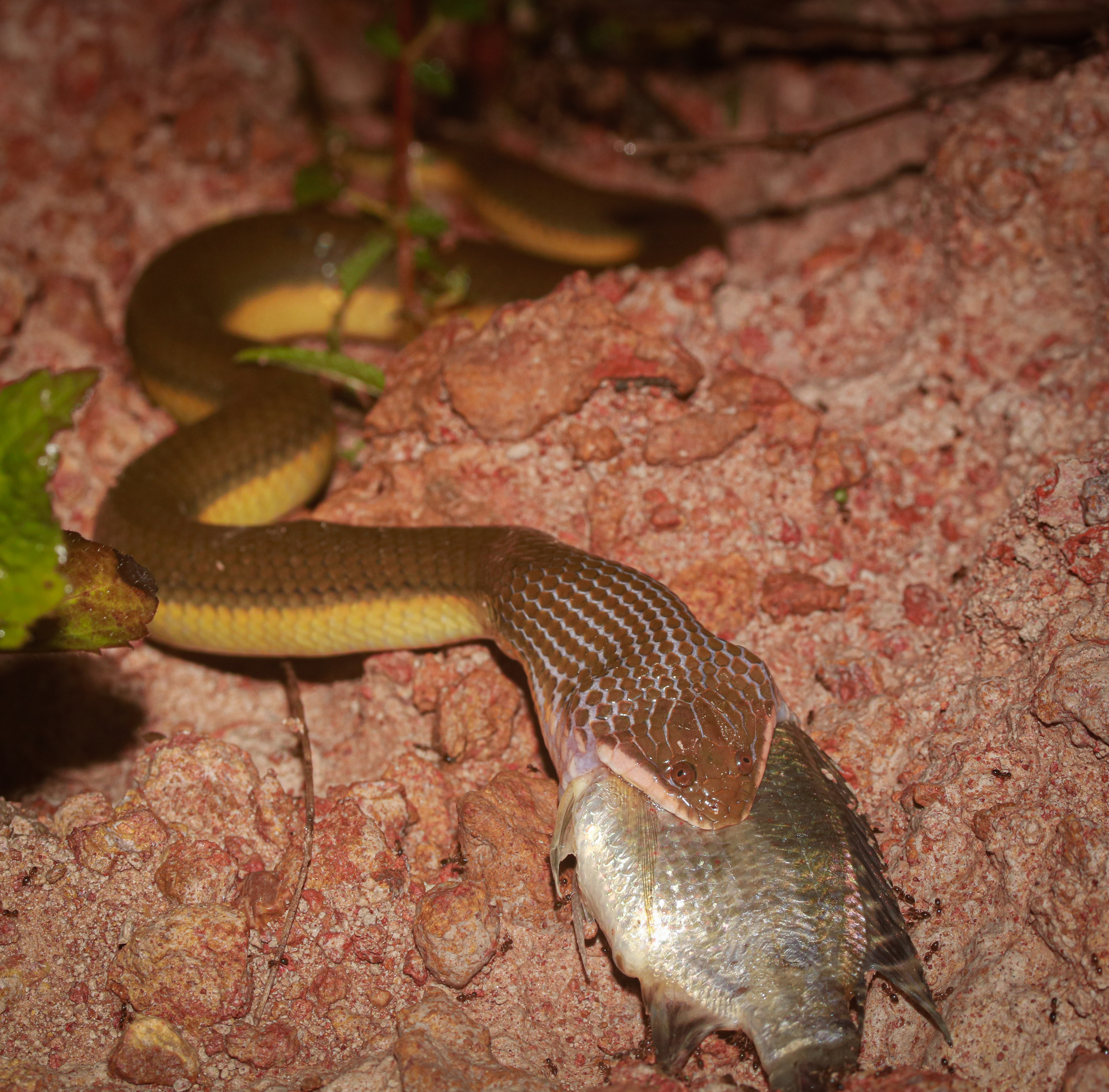
Eating a fish

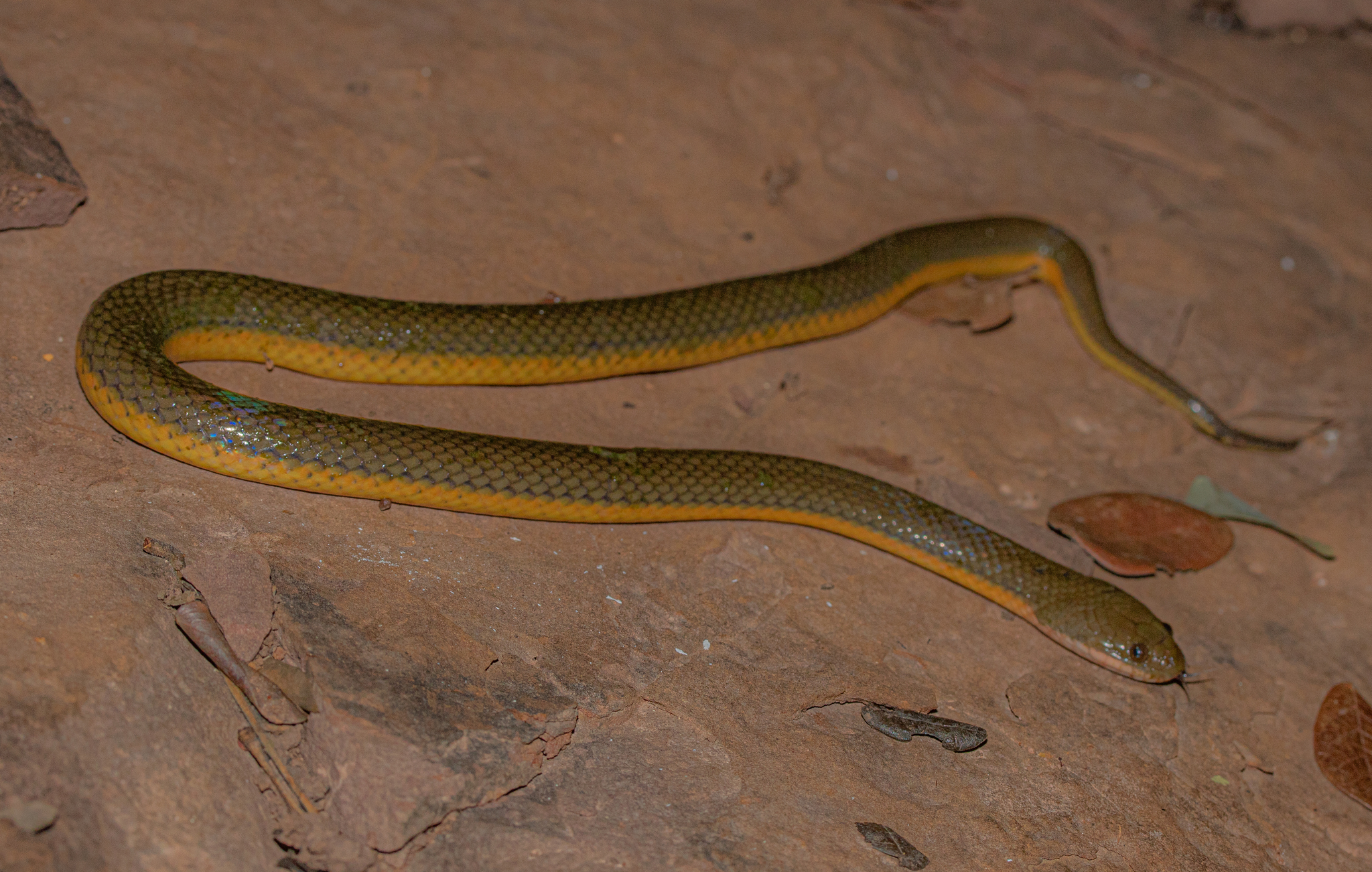
In Thailand
