= Batara Guru =

Supreme god in Indonesian mythology

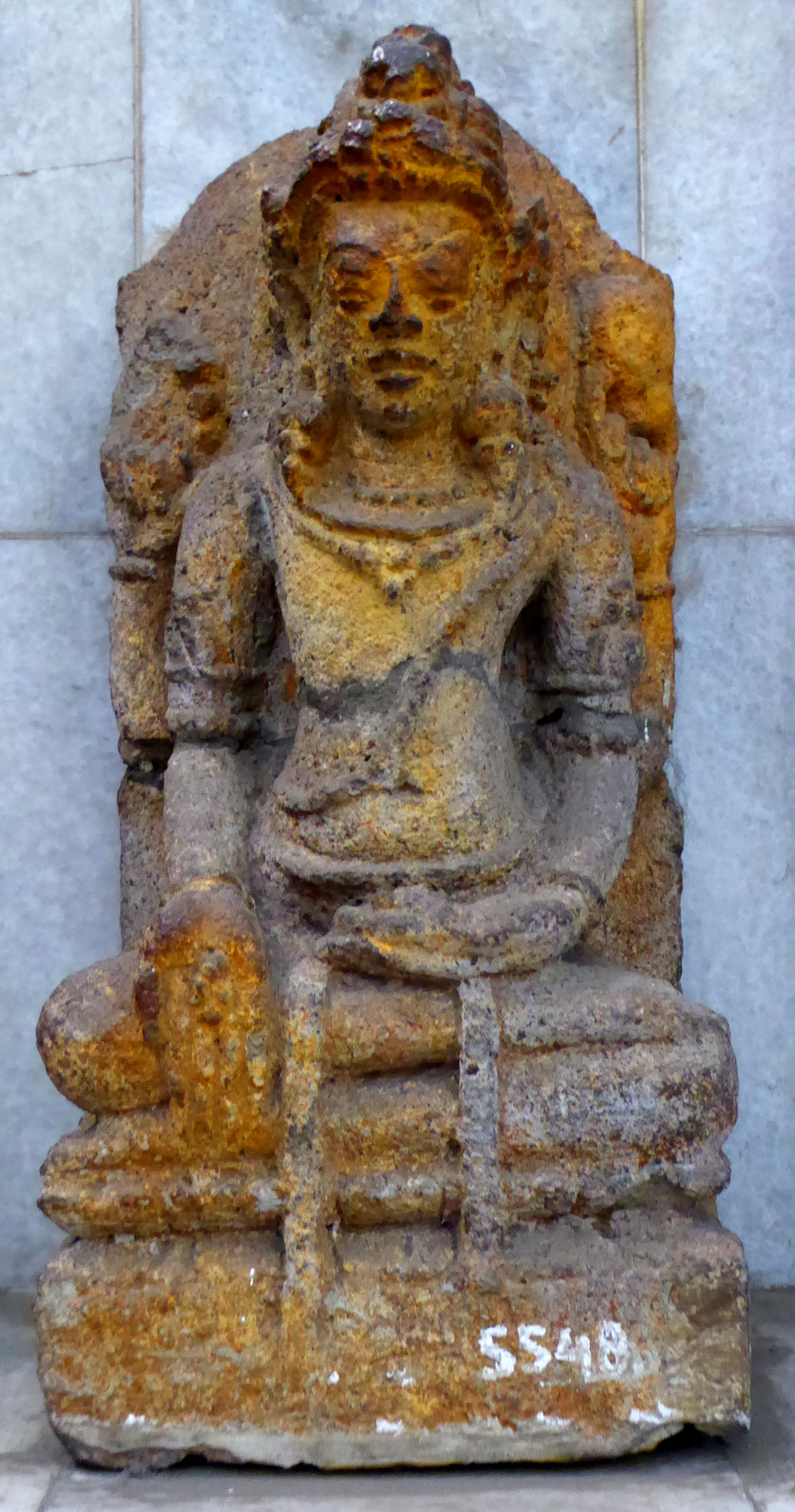
8th/9th century CE Batara Guru (Shiva) from Central Java, Indonesia.

Batara Guru (also called Bhattara Guru, Debata Batara Guru and Batara Siwa) is the name of a supreme god in Indonesian Hinduism. His name is derived from Sanskrit Bhattaraka which means “noble lord". He has been conceptualized in Southeast Asia as a kind spiritual teacher, the first of all Gurus in Indonesian Hindu texts, mirroring the guru Dakshinamurti aspect of Hindu god Shiva in the Indian subcontinent. However, Batara Guru has more aspects than the Indian Shiva, as the Indonesian Hindus blended their spirits and heroes with him. Batara Guru's wife in Southeast Asia is Shiva's consort Durga.

Batara Guru is considered as a form of Rudra-Shiva, a creator god in mythologies found in Javanese and Balinese Hindu texts, in a manner similar to Brahma-related mythologies in India. He is supreme in Indonesian Hinduism, much like the god Jupiter was in Roman era.

Batara Guru in the mythologies of Sumatra, states David Leeming, is a primal being, creator of earth and first ancestor of human beings. He is conceptualized quite similar to the creator deity found in Central Asia and Native North America. According to Martin Ramstedt, Batara Guru in other parts of Indonesia is sometimes identified with Shiva, and elsewhere as transcending "Brahma, Vishnu, Shiva and Buddha".

== Etymology ==
Batara Guru, or Bhattara Guru, is derived from Sanskrit Bhattaraka which means “noble lord". It refers to Siwa (Shiva) in the form of a guru, in Indonesian Hinduism. According to Rachel Storm, the Indian god Shiva was known as Batara Guru outside of Indonesian Islands, and Batara Guru was the name for Shiva in rest of Southeast Asia.

According to John Crawfurd, the word Batara is derived from avatara, both in "sense and orthography" and simply is a prefix to connote any deity.

== Luwu, Indonesia ==
Batara Guru in Luwu, Indonesia has been conceptualized as formless, potent, invisible and unlocatable, states Shelly Errington. Batara Guru does not answer to anyone else because he is everything, without boundary, without center, without edge, without emptiness. Batara Guru, states Errington, is considered perfectly one without form who is everything, everywhere all the time.

== In Batak mythology ==
Batara Guru is one of the Debata na Tolu (trinity gods), that rule Banua Ginjang (upper world, the realm of the gods). He and his brothers - Debata Sori Pada and Debata Mangala Bulan - were born from three eggs hatched by a divine giant hen, Manuk Patia Raja, an avatar of Debata Asi Asi (Shiva). He married a goddess named Siboru Porti Bulan and has two sons (Mula Songta and Mula Songti) and two daughters (Siboru Sorba Jati and Siboru Deak Parujar). Later, Siboru Deak Parujar married Siraja Odap Odap and bore children who became the ancestors of the human beings that inhabit Banua Tonga (middle world, i.e. the Earth).

== In Bugis mythology ==
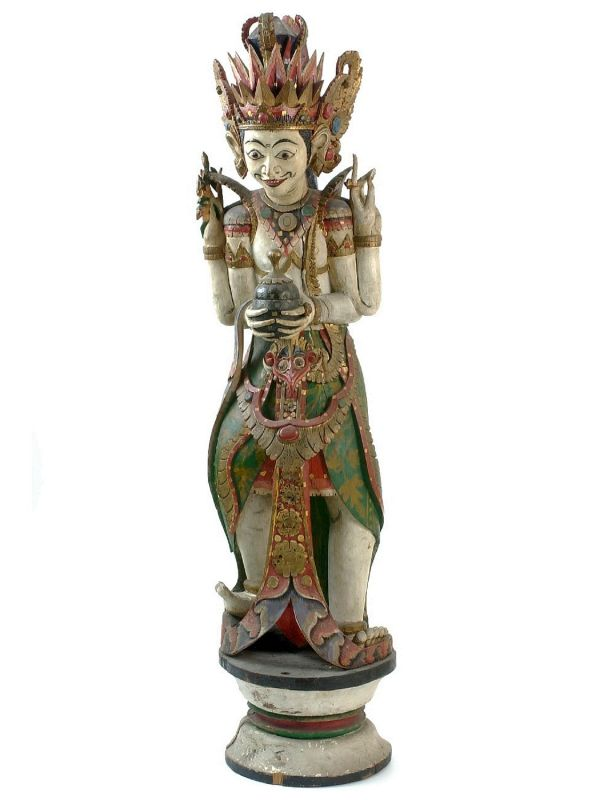
Bhattara Guru, Tropenmuseum collection

According to Sureq Galigo, Batara Guru was a god, the son of Sang Patotoqe and Datu Palingeq, who was sent to earth to cultivate it as human being. His divine name was La Togeq Langiq. He had at least ten children from his five concubines, but only one son from his beloved consort, We Nyiliq Timoq. He is the father of Batara Lattuq and grand father of Sawerigading, the main characters in the Bugis myth Sureq Galigo. He is also the father of Sangiang Serri, the goddess of rice and fertility in Bugis mythology.

The children of Batara Guru (according to Sureq Galigo) are:

1. We Oddang Nriuq (a.k.a. Sangiang Serri) by We Saung Nriuq, his concubine
2. La Pangoriseng by We Leleq Ellung, his concubine
3. La Temmalureng by We Saung Nriuq
4. La Temmalolo (twin brother of La Temmalureng) by We Saung Nriuq
5. La Lumpongeng by Apung Talaga, his concubine
6. La Pattaungeng by Tenritalunruq, his concubine
7. We Temmaraja by Apung Ritoja, his concubine
8. La Tenriepeng by We Saung Nriuq
9. La Temmaukkeq by We Leleq Ellung
10. La Sappe Ilek by Apung Talaga
11. La Tenrioddang by Tenritalunruq
12. Batara Lattuq by We Nyiliq Timoq, his beloved consort

== In Javanese mythology ==
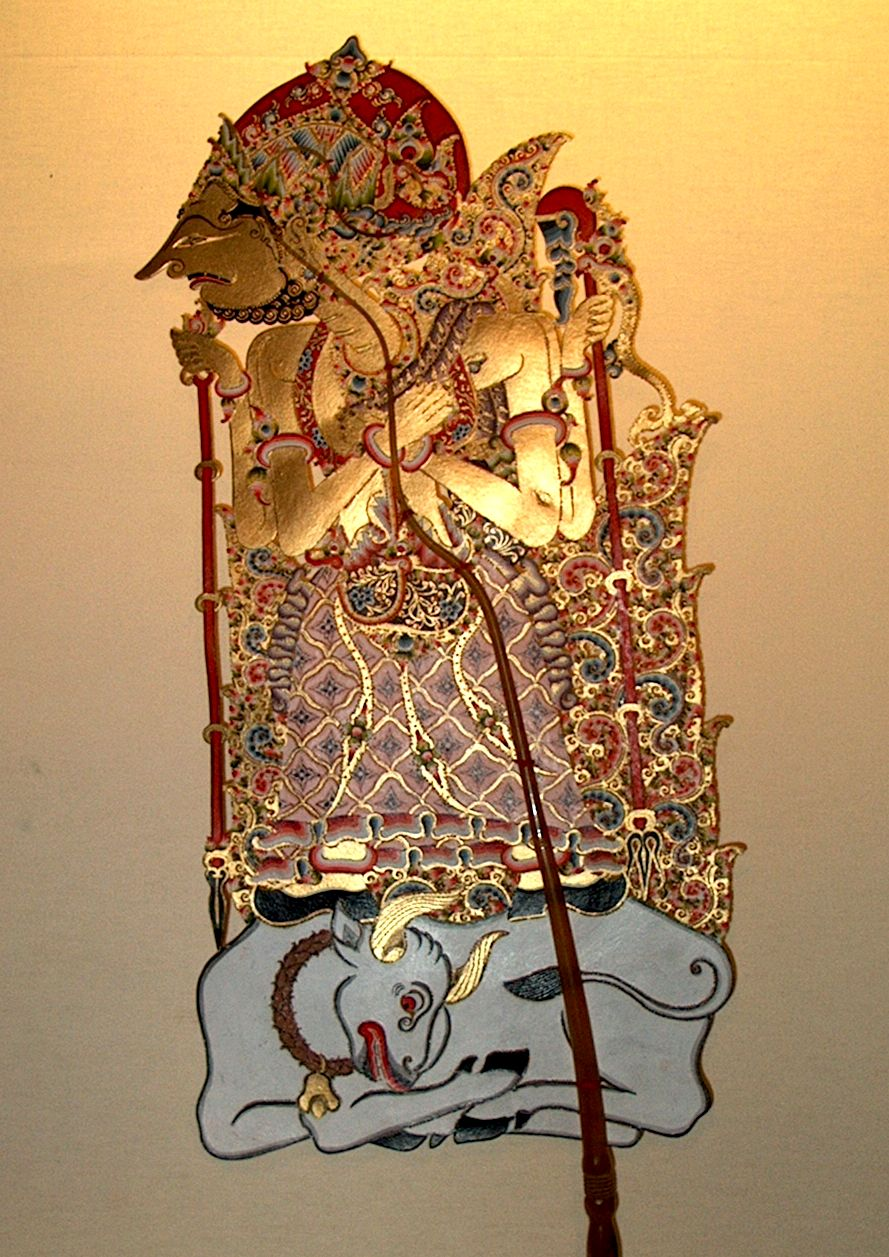
Batara guru with Nandi bull in Javanese wayang (puppet theatre) artworks.

According to Javanese mythology, Batara Guru is a dewa that rules kahyangan, the realm of the gods. He is an avatar of Shiva that gives revelations, gifts and abilities. Batara Guru has a shakti (consort) named Dewi Uma and begat some children. In wayang kulit, Batara Guru is the only character whose feet face forward, with four hands, pointed canine teeth, a blue neck and paralyzed legs. He always rides his vahana, Nandini the cow, and is also known by several names including Sang Hyang Manikmaya, Sang Hyang Caturbuja, Sang Hyang Otipati, Sang Hyang Jagadnata, Nilakanta, Trinetra, Girinata.

Batara Guru has two brothers, Sang Hyang Antaga and Sang Hyang Ismaya. Their parents are Sang Hyang Tunggal and Dewi Rekatawati. One day, Dewi Rekatawati laid a shining egg. Sang Hyang Tunggal transformed the egg using his powers. Its shell turned into Sang Hyang Antaga, the firstborn. The egg white turned into Sang Hyang Ismaya (Semar), and its yolk turned into Sang Hyang Manikmaya. Later, Sang Hyang Tunggal appointed the two elder gods to descend to earth and look after the descendants of the gods. Sang Hyang Antaga (Togog) looks after the giant race, and Sang Hyang Ismaya (Semar) looks after humans, especially Pandava, while Batara Guru (also known as Sang Hyang Manikmaya) led the gods in kahyangan.

Batara Guru offspring in Javanese mythologies include Batara Sambu, Batara Brahma, Batara Indra, Batara Bayu, Batara Wisnu and Batara Kala.

== See also ==
- Agama Hindu Dharma
- Dewi Sri
- Hinduism in Java
- Hyang
- Indonesian Esoteric Buddhism
- Indonesian mythology
- Kejawèn
- Bathala
- Daikokuten
- Mahākāla
- Dakshinamurthy
