= Wawacan Sulanjana =

Sudanese manuscript

Wawacan Sulanjana is a Sundanese manuscript containing Sundanese myths. The title means "The Tale of Sulanjana", derived from the name of the hero Sulanjana as the protector of rice plant against the attack of Sapi Gumarang cow, Kalabuat and Budug Basu boars symbolizing rice pestilence. The Wawacan Sulanjana contains Sundanese local wisdom through reverence of rice cultivation in its tradition.

The text in Wawacan Sulanjana tells the myth of the Sundanese gods, especially that of the rice goddess Nyi Pohaci Sanghyang Asri (Sri Lakshmi). It also describes the wealth of the ancient kingdom of Pajajaran or Sunda Kingdom with its legendary king Siliwangi. Additionally, it describes the agricultural nature of Sundanese people. The origin of Wawacan Sulanjana probably began as an oral tradition of Pantun Sunda transmitted orally by village story teller across generations. The present copy of Wawacan Sulanjana was estimated to be compiled and composed in a later period, around the 17th to 19th centuries, after the adoption of Islam among the Sundanese. It contains several traces of Islamic mythology such as the Sundanese gods being connected to biblical figures like Adam and the demon Idajil being connected to the Devil (Satan) in Biblical tradition. The present myth contain influences of Hindu and Islamic mythology. However, most of the mythology derives from far older pre-Hindu and pre-Islamic aspect of ancient Sundanese culture. Some trace of Javanese culture is also present, such as the reference to the deity Batara Ismaya disguised as the old servant Ki Semar, and the mentioning of Nawang Wulan apsara that magically cooks rice. In 1907, Plyte translated and compiled the "Wawacan Sulanjana".

== Summary ==
=== The creation of the world ===
The story begins with the creation mythology of the universe by a single supreme God, and with peculiar connection to the Biblical figure of Adam as the ancestor of Sundanese gods. These sections were likely added later to the original version in order to incorporate Islamic mythology and ideas after the adoption of Islam. The highest God of Sunda Wiwitan belief, the Sang Hyang Kersa ("The Powerful") created the universe and also other gods such as Mother Goddess Batari Sunan Ambu, and Batara Guru (identified as Shiva after the adoption of Hinduism). Many other gods were adopted from Hinduism such as Indra and Vishnu. Batara Guru rules the kahyangan or svargaloka as the king of gods. Sang Hyang Kersa also created seven bataras (lesser demigods) in Sasaka Pusaka Buana (The Sacred Place on Earth), they ruled various locations in Sunda lands.

=== The myth of the rice goddess ===
Once upon a time in svargaloka (heaven), Batara Guru (in ancient Hindu Javanese is associated with Shiva), the highest god commanded all the gods and goddesses to contribute their power in order to build a new palace of Bale Pancawarna. Anybody who disobeyed this commandment are considered lazy and would lose their arms and legs. Upon hearing the Batara Guru's commandment, one of the gods, Anta (Ananta Boga), a Nāga god, was very anxious. He didn't have arms or legs and he wasn't sure how he could possibly do the job. Anta was shaped as a serpent and he could not work. He sought advice from Batara Narada, the younger brother of Batara Guru. But unfortunately Narada was also confused by Anta's bad luck. Anta became very upset and cried.

As he was crying three teardrops fell on the ground. Miraculously, after touching the ground those teardrops became three beautiful shining eggs that looked like jewels or pearls. Batara Narada advised him to offer those "jewels" to the Batara Guru hoping that the gift would appease him and he would give a fair judgement for Anta's disability.

With the three eggs in his mouth Anta went to the Batara Guru's palace. On the way there he was approached by an eagle (in some traditions, it is described as a crow) who asked him a question. Anta keep silent and could not answer the question because he is holding the eggs is in his mouth. However, the bird thought that Anta was being arrogant and it became furious and began to attack Anta. As the result one egg fell to earth and shattered. Anta quickly tried to hide in the bushes but the bird was waiting for him. The second attack left Anta with only one egg to offer to the Batara Guru. The two broken eggs fell to the earth and became twin boars Kalabuat and Budug Basu. Later, Kalabuat and Budug Basu was adopted by Sapi Gumarang cow. Sapi Gumarang was accidentally conceived when a female cow accidentally drink the urine of the devil Idajil.

Finally he arrived at the palace and offered his teardrop in the shape of a shiny egg to the Batara Guru. The offer was graciously accepted and the Batara Guru asked him to nest the egg until it hatched. Miraculously the egg hatched into a very beautiful baby girl. He gave the baby girl to the Batara Guru and his wife Batari Umah (Uma).

Nyai Pohaci (sometimes spelled "Pwah Aci") Sanghyang Asri was her name and she grew up into a beautiful princess in the heavenly kingdom. Every god who saw her became attracted to her, even her foster father, Batara Guru started to feel attracted to her. Seeing the Batara Guru's desire toward his foster daughter, all the gods became worried. Because Batari Umah had nurtured and breastfeed Sanghyang Asri, she is considered as her daughter, and this means she is Batara Guru's daughter too. Marying one's daughter is considered as incest and it is taboo. Fearing that this scandal could destroy the harmony in heaven, finally the gods led by Batara Narada conspired to separate Nyi Pohaci and the Batara Guru.

To avoid scandal and to keep the peace in the heavenly kingdom, and also to protect Nyi Pohaci's chastity, Batara Narada led the gods to plan for her murder. The gods collected all the most powerful poisons from all around the world and put it in a small container. The poison was later secretly put into Sri's drink. She was poisoned to death and died almost instantly. Her sudden death had caused guilt and fear among gods, since they have committed the sin of killing an innocent girl. This unjust act had incited the wrath of the universe and Sang Hyang Kersa, the supreme god that usually kept silent, punished the gods by sending the storm and peculiar harsh weather upon the heavenly kingdom. In tears of fears the gods took her body away from heaven and buried somewhere on earth in a far and hidden place. However, because of Sri Pohaci's innocence and divinity, her grave showed a miraculous sign; for at the time of her burial, up grew some useful plants that would forever benefit human beings. From her head grew coconut; from her nose, lips, and ears grew various spices and vegetables, from her hair grew grass and various flowering plants, from her breasts grew various fruit plants, from her arms and hands grew teak and various wood trees, from her genitals grew Kawung (Aren or Enau: sugar palm), from her thighs grew various types of bamboo, from her legs grew various tuber plants, and finally from her belly button grew a very useful plant that is called padi (rice). In some version, white rice grew from her right eye, while red rice grew from her left eye. All of the useful plants, essential for human needs and wellbeing, are considered to come from the remnant of Dewi Sri's body. From that time, the people of Java island venerated and revered her as the benevolent "Goddess of Rice" and fertility. In the ancient Sunda Kingdom, she was considered the highest goddess and the most important deity for agricultural society.

=== The way to cook rice ===
In the heavenly kingdom, Batara Guru ordered Batara Ismaya, that manifested on earth as Semar, to take these useful plants to the kingdom of Pajajaran and give them to humans to eat and use. Batara Guru also sent his daughter the bidadari (apsara) Nawang Wulan to bring cooked rice to men. Nawang Wulan was one of seven bidadari that sometimes descended to earth to bathe in a clear pond. They descend to earth using a magical colorful sash that enabled them to fly and travel between heaven and earth. When these seven apsaras descended to earth, their colorful sash took form as the seven colors of the rainbow. Nawang Wulan also can be found in the Javanese tale of Jaka Tarub. Nawang Wulan descended to earth and married King Siliwangi of Pajajaran Kingdom. Nawang Wulan magically cooked the rice by putting a single ear of rice grain into a bamboo container and magically the entire ear of rice was cooked and ready to eat. She kept this heavenly magical method secret and ordered everybody to stay away from her pendaringan (traditional cupboard in the kitchen contains rice container and cooking utensils). She insisted that nobody should learn the secret way of cooking rice. One day the King felt curious of the method of cooking rice and peeped inside the hole on the kitchen wall and learned the Nawang Wulan's secret magical way of cooking rice. Because the King has broken his vow, the magical way of cooking rice was undone, and Nawang Wulan had to return to svargaloka and leave her husband King Siliwangi. Because of this accident, Semar had to teach people the more difficult and laborious way of planting and properly cooking the rice, the traditional method as we know it today.

=== The battle between Sulanjana and Gumarang ===
Previously the twin boars Kalabuat and Budug Basu were born from the two broken magical eggs of Anta's tear, and fell to earth. They were adopted and taken care of by Gumarang the cow. Gumarang was a demon buffalo conceived through the urine of the demon Idajil, thus naturally, he is inherently evil. After grown up, Kalabuat and Budug Basu tried to find their sister and finally found Nyi Pohaci Sanghyang Asri's grave. They circled the grave seven times and died upon their sister's grave.

Meanwhile, Dampo Awang from across the sea came with his ships to the land of Sunda to buy the rice. Because the rice is sacred for the Sundanese people and considered as the gift from the gods that actually belongs to gods, nobody dared to sell it. King Siliwangi refused to sell the abundant rice stock stored in leuit (barns) in his kingdom. Dampo Awang was very furious, and in retaliation, he persuaded Gumarang the cow to destroy the rice in the Sunda Kingdom.

The Gumarang buffalo took the body of Kalabuat and Budug Basu from Pohaci's grave and took them to travel, encircling the earth. Miraculously the body of Kalabuat and Budug Basu turned into various animals: pigs, boars, rats, insects, and all kind of animals that are pestilence to rice. The nature of Kalabuat and Budug Basu is to reunite with their sister through eating and destroying rice crop, which is why both are the considered as the manifestations of pests.

To protect the rice, Batara Guru ordered his son, Sulanjana that was living and taken care by the earth goddess Pertiwi, to come to Sunda and fight Gumarang and the pests manifestations of Kalabuat and Budug Basu boars. Sulanjana also identified as Sedana was assisted by his twin sisters to fight Gumarang the buffalo. They fought ferociously until finally Sulanjana succeed to defeat Gumarang and the pestilences. Gumarang the buffalo pleaded to Sulanjana to spare his life. In return he agreed to help Sulanjana to take care the rice plants, lf Sulanjana periodically gave him the offering of fern leaves to eat. Sulanjana agreed and made Gumarang to work the rice paddy, and it became the predecessor of water buffalos that today plow the rice paddy to prepare for rice planting.

== See also ==
- Agama Hindu Dharma
- Baduy Indigenous Ban
- Bujangga Manik
- Carita Parahyangan
- Hyang
- Sanghyang Siksa Kandang Karesian
- Sunda kingdom
