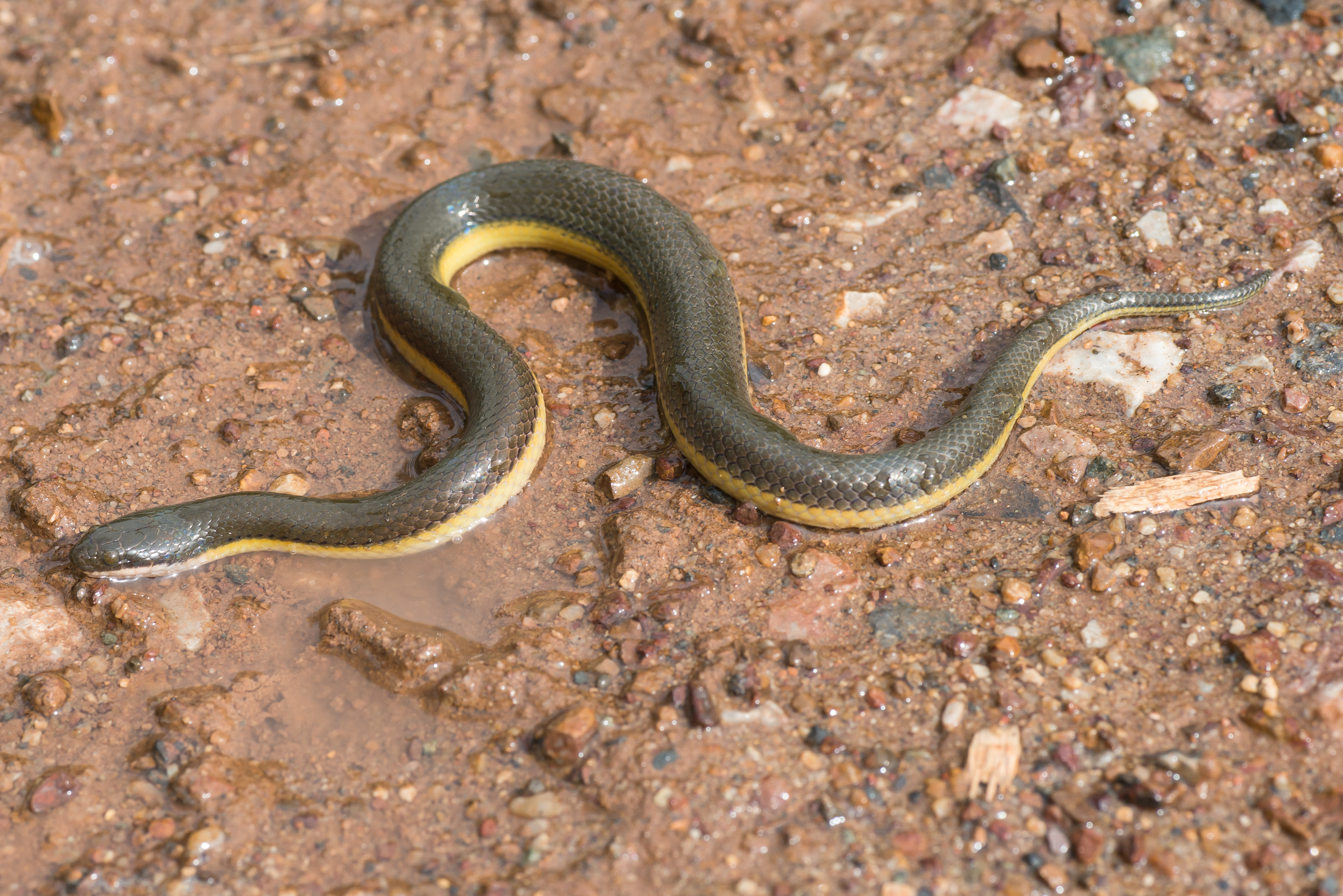
- From Phetchabun Province, western Thailand

Conservation status
- Least Concern (IUCN 3.1)

Scientific classification
- Kingdom: Animalia
- Phylum: Chordata
- Class: Reptilia
- Order: Squamata
- Suborder: Serpentes
- Family: Homalopsidae
- Genus: Hypsiscopus
- Species: H. plumbea

Binomial name
- Hypsiscopus plumbea (F. Boie, 1827)

Synonyms
- Homalopsis plumbea F. Boie, 1827; Coluber plumbeus — Eydoux & Gervais, 1837; Hypsirhina plumbea — Gray, 1842; Eurostus plumbeus — A.M.C. Duméril, Bibron & A.H.A. Duméril, 1854; Enhydris plumbea — Stejneger, 1898

= Hypsiscopus plumbea =

Species of snake

The rice paddy snake (Hypsiscopus plumbea), also known as grey water snake, Boie's mud snake, yellow or orange bellied water snake, lead water snake or plumbeous water snake is a species of non - venomous, rear-fanged snake endemic to South Asia. It is somewhat common, and is one of the most widespread species of water snake in Asia.

== Taxonomy ==
The species epithet, plumbea, means 'lead-like' and refers to the snake's greyish upper body.

DNA evidence suggests that this taxon might be a species complex.

== Description ==
The rice paddy snake is a relatively small snake, reaching a total length (including tail) of up to 72 cm (28 in), although sources vary. This snake feeds readily on small fish, frogs, and occasionally small lizards. It has countershading coloration, which is dark brown to grey in the upper part of its body, and light colored white to yellowish color at the bottom of its body. In some populations, the upper part may be greenish, and dark spots along the vertebral line may also occur. It is mainly nocturnal.

== Distribution and habitat ==
The rice paddy snake is found in the Andaman Islands (India), Myanmar, Thailand, Cambodia, Laos, Malaysia, Indonesia, Vietnam, southern China, and Taiwan.

The rice paddy snake is a common and abundant species associated with a variety of wet habitats.

== Gallery ==
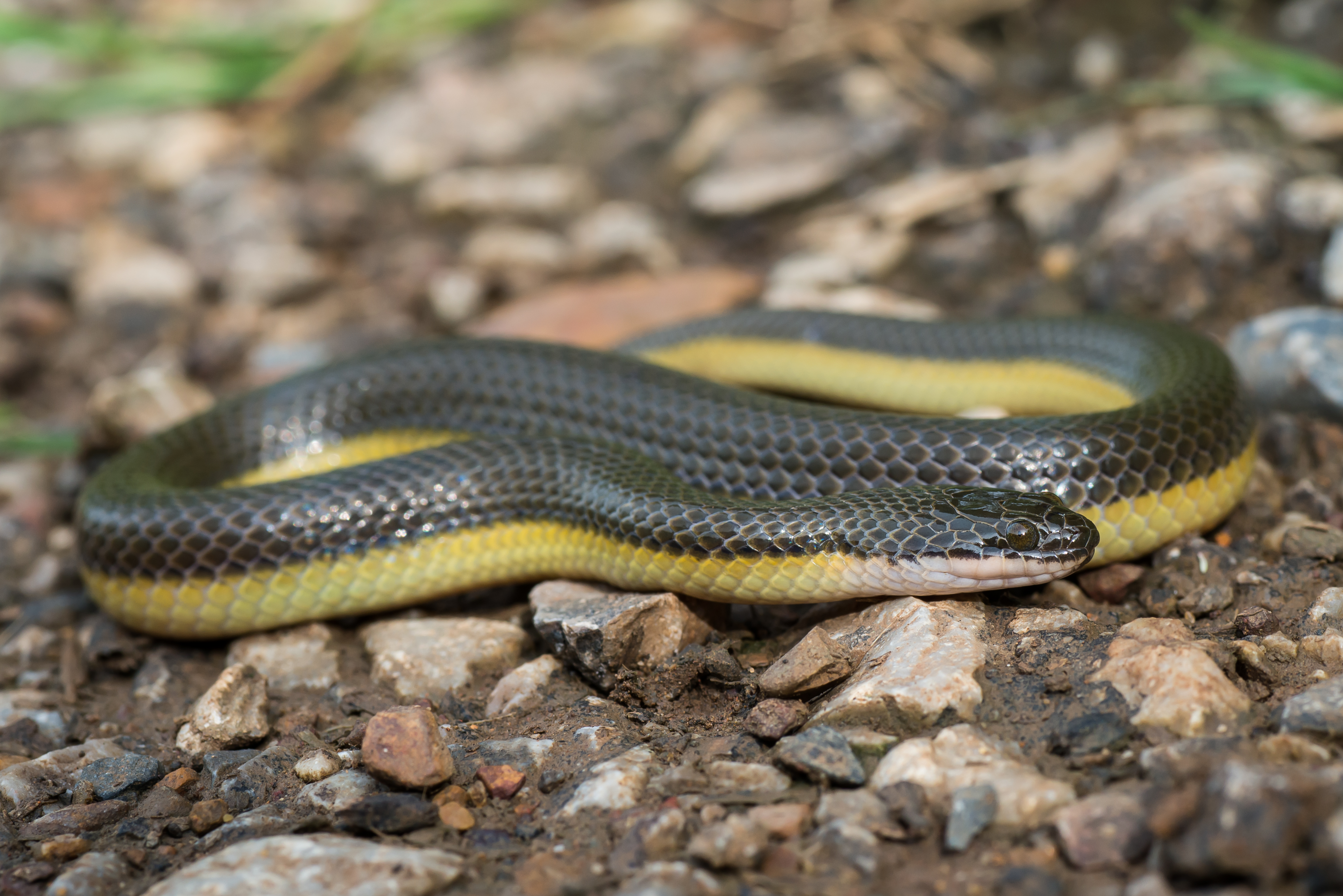
Hypiscopus plumbea at Nong Phai District, Phetchabun Province, Thailand

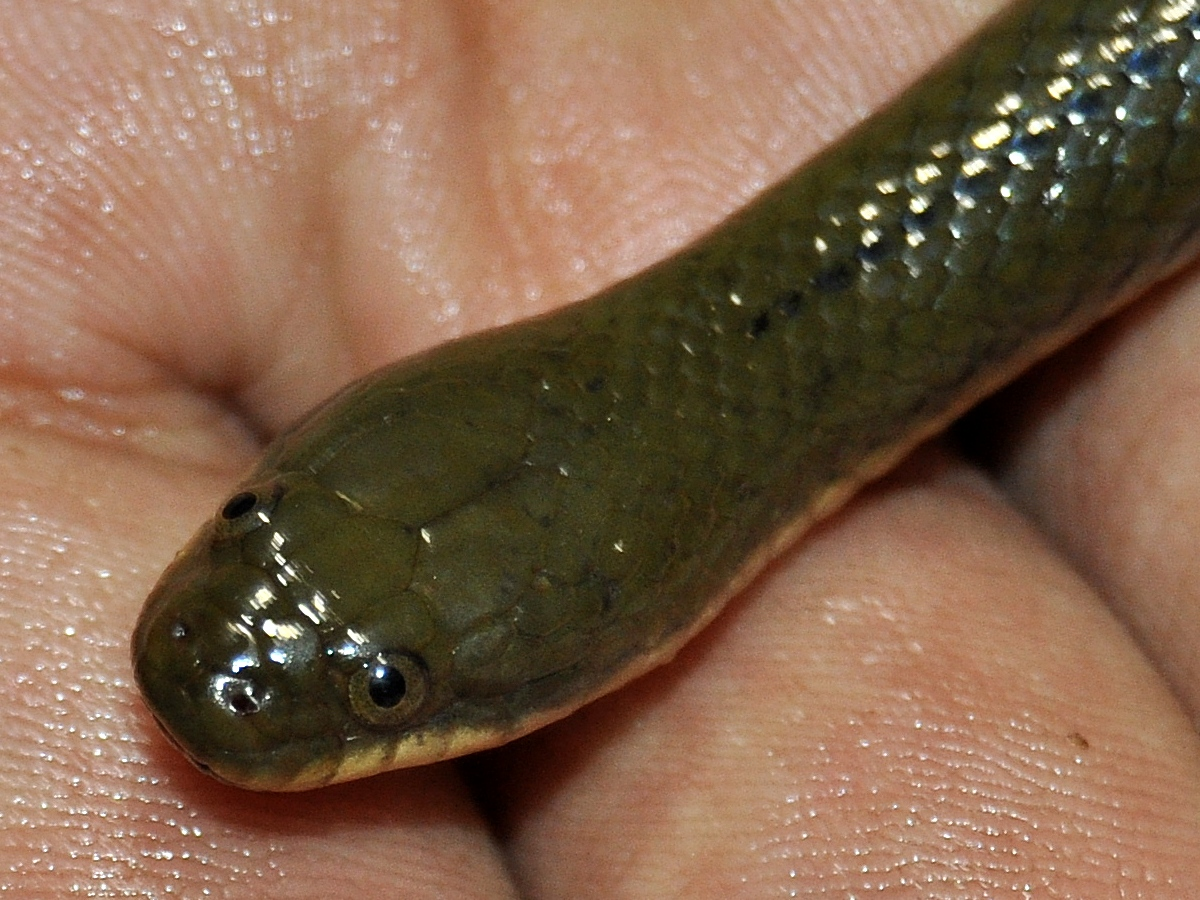
Hypiscopus plumbea
from Karawang, West Java
