= Mutiara =

- District
- Interactive map of Mutiara
- Coordinates: 5.281181°N 95.977067°E
- Country: Indonesia
- Province: Aceh
- Regency: Pidie
- Capital: Beureunun

Area
  - Total: 16.75 km^{2} (6.47 sq mi)

Population (2023)
  - Total: 21,661
  - Density: 1,293/km^{2} (3,349/sq mi)
- Time zone: UTC+7 (WIB)
- Postal Code: 24173

Mutiara is an administrative district (kecamatan) in Pidie Regency, Aceh, Indonesia.
