= Refafu =

Refafu is the god of the Kombai people, located in South Papua, Indonesia.

He is a god of rain forest setting. It is a god that sometimes requires sacrifice of pigs when tribal members happen to kill one for food. There is a possible analogy to platonism with Refafu, as a Kombai man said “The god Refafu handed down these shapes to us," (in "Living with the Kombai" 2008) while pointing to the artwork on his shield, which were geometrical (not really hypnagogic or psychedelic) shapes.
