= Dewi Sri =

Hindu Goddess of rice and fertility in Indonesia

Dewi Sri ꦢꦺꦮꦶꦱꦿꦶ ᬤᬾᬯᬶᬲ᭄ᬭᬶ ᮑᮄ ᮕᮧᮠᮎᮤ ᮞᮀᮠᮡᮀ ᮃᮞᮢᮤ देवी श्री
- Goddess of rice
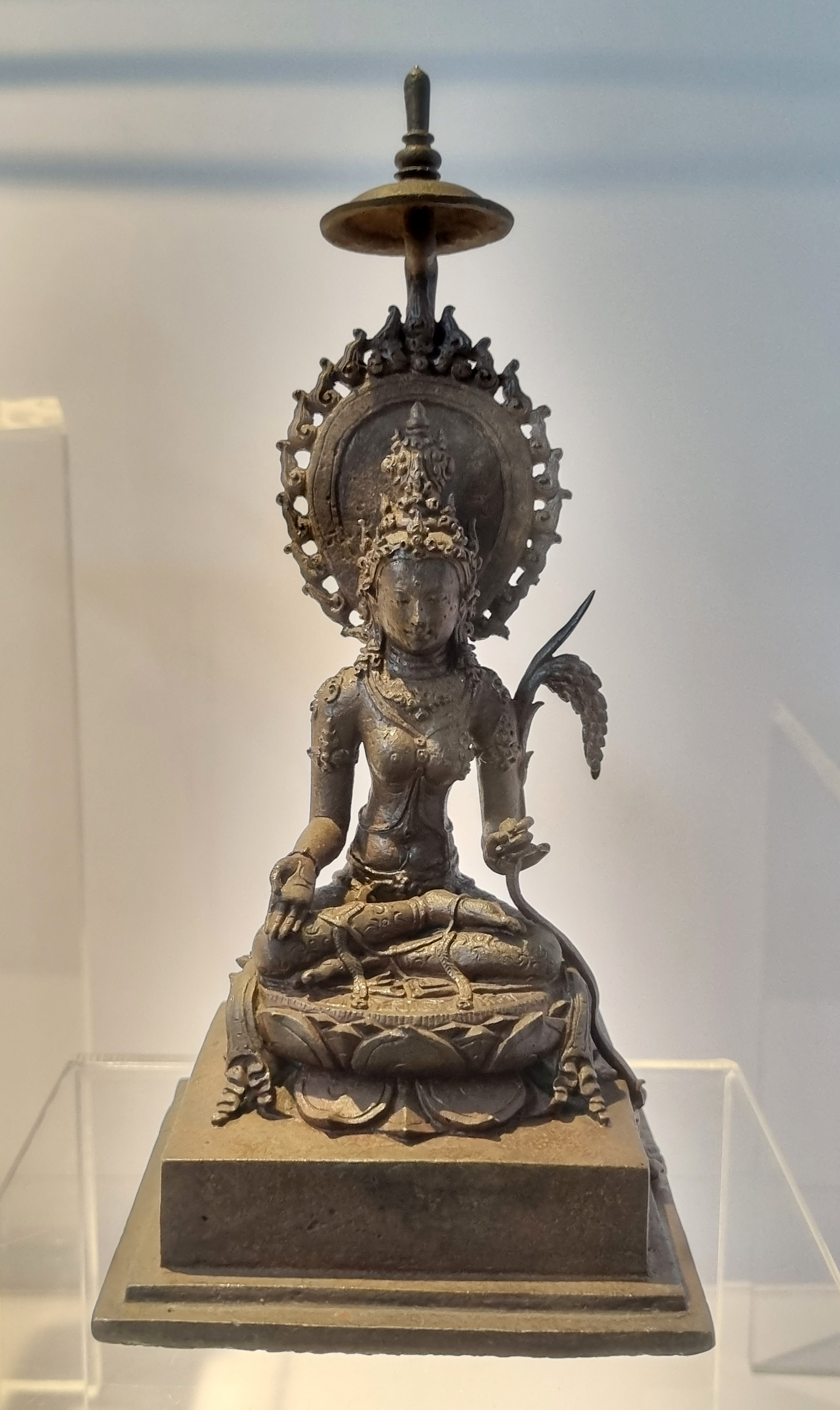
- The depiction of Dewi Sri in 9th century Central Javanese bronze art, collection of Sonobudoyo Museum
- Affiliation: Phosop, Inari, Ceres
- Abode: Paddy field
- Symbol: Rice
- Gender: Female
- Region: Java, Bali, Lombok, Sulawesi

Dewi Sri or Shridevi (Javanese: ꦢꦺꦮꦶꦱꦿꦶ, Balinese: ᬤᬾᬯᬶᬲ᭄ᬭᬶ, Sanskrit: देवी श्री Dewi Sri, Sundanese: ᮑᮄ ᮕᮧᮠᮎᮤ ᮞᮀᮠᮡᮀ ᮃᮞᮢᮤ, Nyai Pohaci Sanghyang Asri) is the Javanese, Sundanese, and Balinese Hindu Goddess of rice and fertility, still widely worshiped on the islands of Java, Bali and Lombok, Indonesia. She is often associated or equated with the Hindu goddess Lakshmi, the shakti (consort) of Vishnu.

== History and origin ==
The worship of the primordial rice goddess has its origin in the prehistoric domestication, development and propagation of rice cultivation in Asia, possibly brought by Austroasiatic or Austronesian population that finally migrated and settled in the archipelago. Similar but slightly different rice spirits and rice deity mythologies are widespread among Indonesian ethnicities and also in neighbouring countries, e.g. in Thailand and Cambodia.

The name "Sri" was derived from Sanskrit (श्री) which means wealth, prosperity, health, beauty, good fortune and also the other name of the Hindu goddess Lakshmi.

Denys Lombard in his book Le Carrefour Javanais. Essai d'Histoire Globale argues that the mythological character of Dewi Sri was originated from India. In Hinduism, the goddess Sri is known as Lakshmi, the shakti or consort of Vishnu. However, the worship of the rice goddess in the Indonesian Archipelago, which is associated with Dewi Sri, has widely spread even in the areas that were not exposed to Indian influences.

Titi Surti Nastiti, a researcher of Pusat Penelitian Arkeologi Nasional however, suggests that the veneration of the goddess of rice has older origin, the rice goddess has been worshipped from the prehistoric period prior of Hindu-Buddhist influence in the archipelago. Several statues made from stone and bronze identified as "Dewi Sri" (goddess Sri) were found in Indonesia, more specifically from ancient Java. Examining the mudra (hand positions) and lakshana (attributes) of the statue, Indonesian Dewi Sri iconography is different from the murti of goddess Sri Lakshmi found in India. In India, the depiction of Lakshmi often shows her holding padma (red lotus) in her hands. The depiction of Dewi Sri in Indonesia has always been related to the goddess of rice. The practice of paying homage to the goddess of rice or the goddess of fertility had already existed before Hindu-Buddhist influences to the archipelago.

Therefore, the siplin (sculptor or statue maker) of ancient Java often depicted the goddess Sri as the goddess of rice. The siplin in ancient Java has a different concept of the goddess Sri as the shakti of Vishnu. The depiction of the goddess Sri is inseparable from the concept of her as the goddess of rice that has been worshipped from the prehistoric period. Therefore, Dewi Sri has a distinctive attribute that depicts this, which is her left hand holding a sprig of rice. In Indonesian society, the veneration of the goddess of rice is very closely related to the fertility worship and its important role in agriculture.

== Regional variants ==
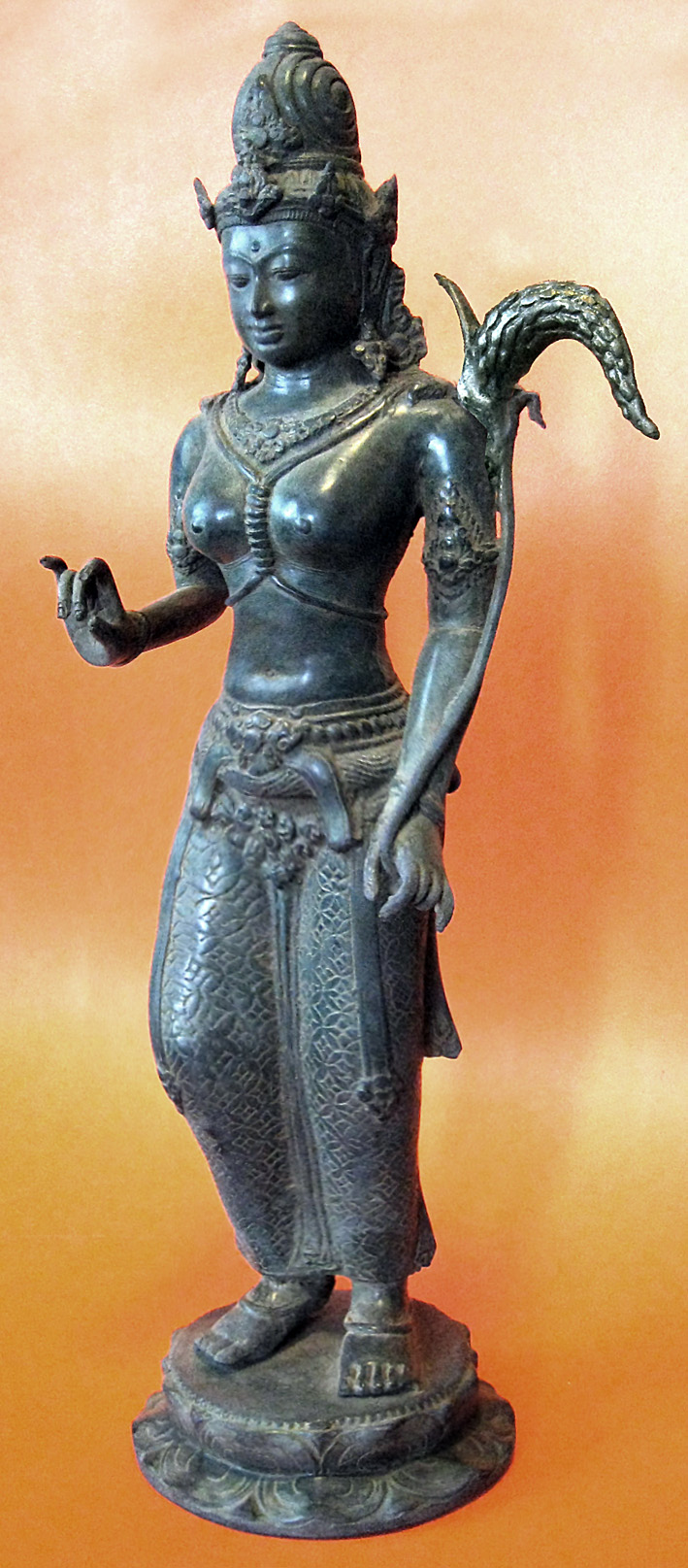
The depiction of Dewi Sri in Central Javan art

The mythology of Dewi Sri is native to Java, among Javanese and Sundanese populations, also linked to Hinduism in the archipelago since early as the first century. She was equated with the Hindu goddess Shri Lakshmi, and often regarded as an incarnation or one of her manifestations. The goddess is also associated with wealth and prosperity.

In Java, the oldest Javanese manuscript that mentioned about the legend of Dewi Sri is Tantu Pagelaran. Tantu Panggelaran is a Javanese literary work in the medieval Javanese language, which is a transition language between ancient Javanese and modern Javanese. It is estimated was written in the Majapahit era, around the 15th century.

In West Java Dewi Sri is known as Nyai Pohaci Sanghyang Asri. Sundanese manuscripts that mentions the legends of Nyai Pohaci among others are Wawacan Pohaci, Cariyos Sawargaloka, Wawacan Sanghyang Sri, Wawacan Puhaci Dandayang, Wawacan Dewi Sri, and Wawacan Sulanjana.

Meanwhile, one of the legends related to Dewi Sri in Central Java is Sri Sedana. In Madura island, the figure of Dewi Sri is identified as Ratna Dumilah. In Bali, Dewi Sri is also known as Sri Sadhana, Rambut Sadhana, Dewi Danu, or Dewa Ayu Manik Galih. In North Sumatra, the mythological figure of Dewi Sri appears in the Daru Dayang story.

The Buginese of Southern Sulawesi has a myth about Sanging Serri written in the ancient manuscripts Sureq Galigo. The main theme of Sangiang Serri story is actually almost the same as the story of Dewi Sri in Java. As in Ende, the story of Dewi Sri is present in the story of Bobi and Nombi. Dewi Sri is also known as Ine Pare or Ine Mbu. There is also a story that refers to Dewi Sri on Kei Island, Maluku, through a story about a young man named Letwir. Javanese and Balinese influences are believed to be behind the existence of this story, because paddy and rice are not the staple food of the Kei people.

== Attributes and legends ==
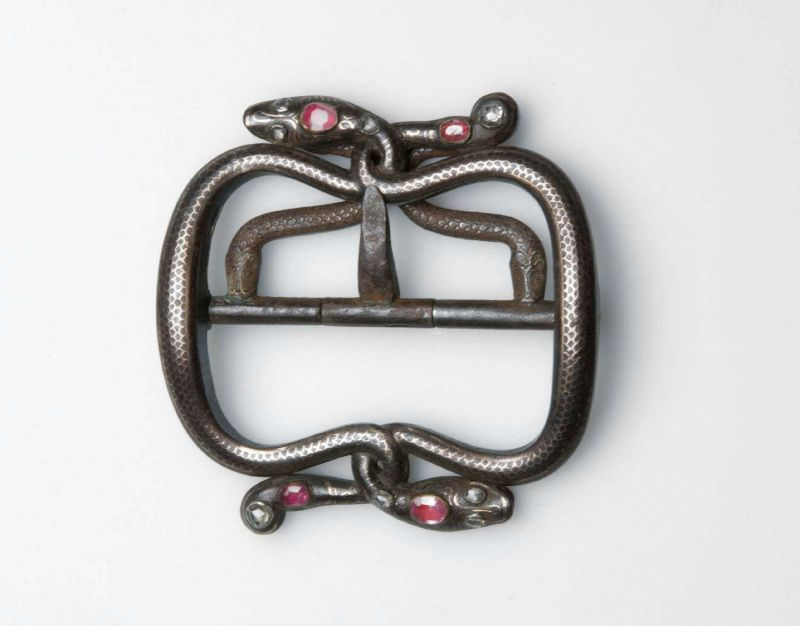
Javanese belt buckle with snake decoration called Timang Ular-ular. Snakes may be connected to Nyi Pohaci or Dewi Sri, the goddess of fertility

Dewi Sri is believed to have dominion over rice and the staple food of Indonesians; hence life and wealth or prosperity; most especially rice surpluses for the wealth of kingdoms in Java such as Sunda, Majapahit and Mataram; and their inverse: poverty, famine, hunger, disease (to a certain extent). She is often associated with the rice paddy snake (ular sawah).

=== Mythology ===
Most of the stories regarding Dewi Sri are associated with the mythical origin of the rice plant, the staple food of the region. Examples of this can be found in the "Wawacan Sulanjana":

Once upon a time in heaven, Batara Guru (who in ancient Javanese Hinduism was associated with Shiva), the highest god, commanded all the gods and goddesses to contribute their power in order to build a new palace. Anybody who disobeyed this commandment would be considered lazy and would lose their arms and legs. Upon hearing the Batara Guru's commandment, one of the gods, Antaboga (Ananta Boga), a Nāga god, became very anxious. He didn't have arms or legs, and he wasn't sure how he could possibly do the job. Anta was shaped like a serpent, and he could not work. He sought advice from Batara Narada, the younger brother of Batara Guru. But unfortunately, Narada was also confused by Anta's bad luck. Anta became very upset and cried.

As he was crying, three teardrops fell to the ground. Miraculously, after touching the ground, the teardrops became three beautiful shining eggs that looked like jewels or pearls. Batara Narada advised him to offer these "jewels" to the Batara Guru, hoping that the gift would appease him and he would give a fair judgment, taking into account Anta's disability.

With the three eggs in his mouth, Anta went to the Batara Guru's palace. On the way there, he was approached by an eagle who asked him a question. Anta kept silent and could not answer, as he was holding the eggs in his mouth. Because of his perceived unwillingness to answer, the bird thought Anta was being arrogant, and it became furious and began to attack Anta. As a result, one egg fell to earth and shattered. Anta quickly tried to hide in the bushes, but the bird was waiting for him. The second attack left Anta with only one egg to offer to the Batara Guru. The two eggs that had fallen to the earth became the twin boars Kalabuat and Budug Basu.

At last, he arrived at the palace and offered his teardrop in the shape of a shiny egg to the Batara Guru. The offer was graciously accepted, and the Batara Guru asked him to nest the egg until it hatched. Miraculously, the egg hatched into a very beautiful baby girl. He gave the baby girl to the Batara Guru and his wife.

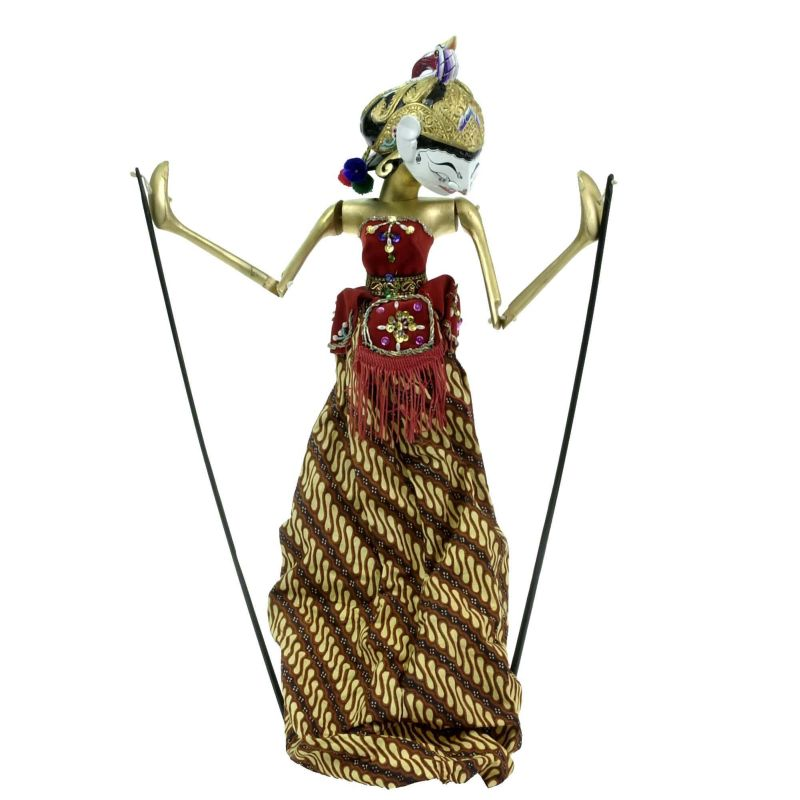
Dewi Sri in Sundanese wayang golek wooden puppet theatre

Nyai Pohaci (sometimes spelled "Pwah Aci") Sanghyang Asri was her name, and she grew up into a beautiful princess. Every god who saw her became attracted to her, even her foster father, Batara Guru started to feel attracted to her. Seeing the Batara Guru's desire for his foster daughter, the gods grew worried. They feared that this scandal might destroy the harmony in heaven, so finally, they conspired to separate Nyi Pohaci and the Batara Guru.

To keep the peace in the heavens and to protect Nyi Pohaci's chastity, all the gods planned for her to die. She was poisoned, and her body was buried somewhere on earth in a far and hidden place. However, because of Sri Pohaci's innocence and divinity, her grave showed a miraculous sign; for at the time of her burial, some plants grew from the ground that would forever benefit mankind. From her head grew coconut; from her nose, lips, and ears grew various spices and vegetables, from her hair grew grass and various flowering plants, from her breasts grew various fruit plants, from her arms and hands grew teak and various wood trees, from her genitals grew Kawung (Aren or Enau: sugar palm), from her thighs grew various types of bamboo, from her legs grew various tuber plants, and finally from her belly button grew a very useful plant that is called padi (rice). In some versions, white rice grew from her right eye, while red rice grew from her left eye.

All of the useful plants, essential for human needs and well-being, are thought to come from the remnant of Dewi Sri's body. From that time on, the people of the Island of Java venerated and revered her as the benevolent "Goddess of Rice" and fertility. In the ancient Sunda Kingdom, she was considered the highest goddess and the most important deity for agricultural society.

Most Dewi Sri myths involve Dewi Sri (also known as Dewi Asri, Nyi Pohaci, among others) and her brother Sedana (also known as Sedhana, Sadhana, Sadono, and others), set either in the kingdom of Medang Kamulan (corresponding to the historical Medang Kingdom) or in Heaven (involving gods such as Batara Guru) or both. In all versions where Sedana appears with Dewi Sri, they end up separated from one another, through either death, wandering, or a refusal to be married.

Some versions make a correlation between Sri and the large Rice Paddy Snake (ular sawah) and Sadhana with the paddy swallow (sriti).

The nāga or snake, particularly the king cobra is a common fertility symbol throughout Asia, in contrast to being considered representative of temptation, sin or wickedness as in Judeo-Christian belief.

=== Depiction ===
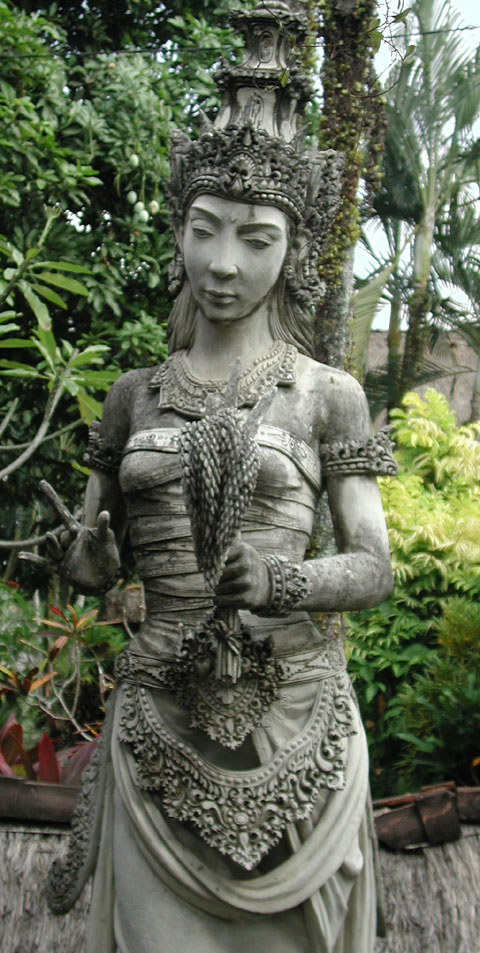
Balinese Dewi Sri

Dewi Sri is always depicted as a youthful, beautiful, slim yet curvaceous woman, with stylised facial features idiosyncratic to the respective locale, essentially a woman at the height of her femininity and fertility. In Javanese iconography, Dewi Sri is usually depicted wearing green, white or golden yellow clothes with regal jewelry attire, similar to Hindu goddess Lakshmi, and holding a rice plant with full rice grains in one of her hands as her attribute (lakçana). High Javanese culture reflecting the wayang aesthetic dictates she is depicted with a white face, thin-downward cast eyes and a serene expression. There is much cross-pollination between the qualities, aesthetics and so forth between the deity Dewi Sri and the wayang character Sinta in the Javanese version of the Ramayana and the same for Rama with Sedhana.

The loro blonyo (two "pedestals" or foundations) statue also has some overlap with Dewi Sri and Sedhana. Balinese people have certain rituals to rever Dewi Sri by making an effigy as her representation from janur (young coconut leaf), lontar leaf, or from cakes made of rice flour.

=== Ritual and custom ===
Javanese traditional kirab procession bringing Dewi Sri image made of rice.

Dewi Sri remains highly revered, especially by the Javanese, Balinese, and Sundanese of Indonesia, though there are many regional analogues or variations of her legend throughout Indonesia. Despite most Indonesians being observant Sunni Muslims or Balinese Hindus, the indigenous underlying animist-era beliefs, notably of Sunda Wiwitan and Kejawen, remain very strong, are worshiped parallel to Islam, Buddhism, Hinduism and Christianity without conflict; and are cultivated by the Royal Courts, especially of Cirebon, Ubud, Surakarta and Yogyakarta, which are also popular local and international tourist attractions. The Javanese harvest ceremony is called Sekaten or Grebeg Mulud which also corresponds to Maulid Nabi; the birth of Muhammad.

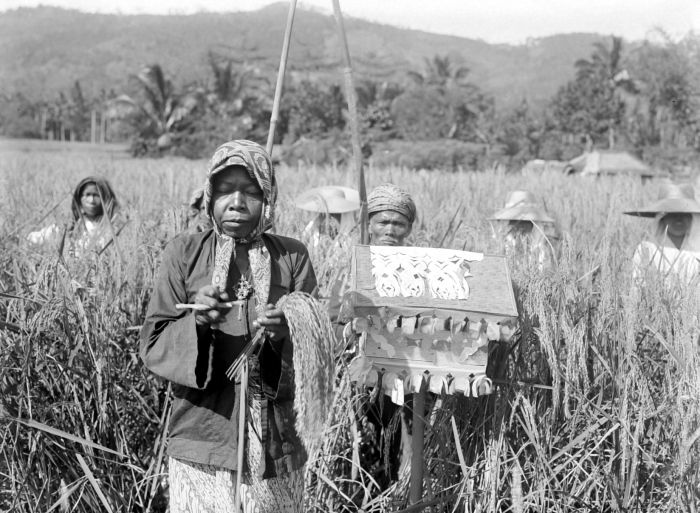
A small shrine for Dewi Sri in the rice field, Karangtengah.

Traditional Javanese people, especially those who are observant Kejawen, in particular have a small shrine called Pasrean (the place of Sri) in their house dedicated to Dewi Sri, decorated with her bust, idol or other likeness of her alone; or with Sedana and possibly with a ceremonial or functional ani-ani or ketam: a small palm harvesting knife, or arit: the small, sickle-shaped rice-harvesting knife. This shrine is commonly decorated with intricate carvings of snakes (occasionally snake-dragons: naga). Worshippers make token food offerings and prayers to Dewi Sri so she may grant health and prosperity to the family. The traditional male-female couple sculpture of Loro Blonyo is considered the personification of Sri and Sedana or Kamarati and Kamajaya, the symbol of domestic happiness and family harmony.

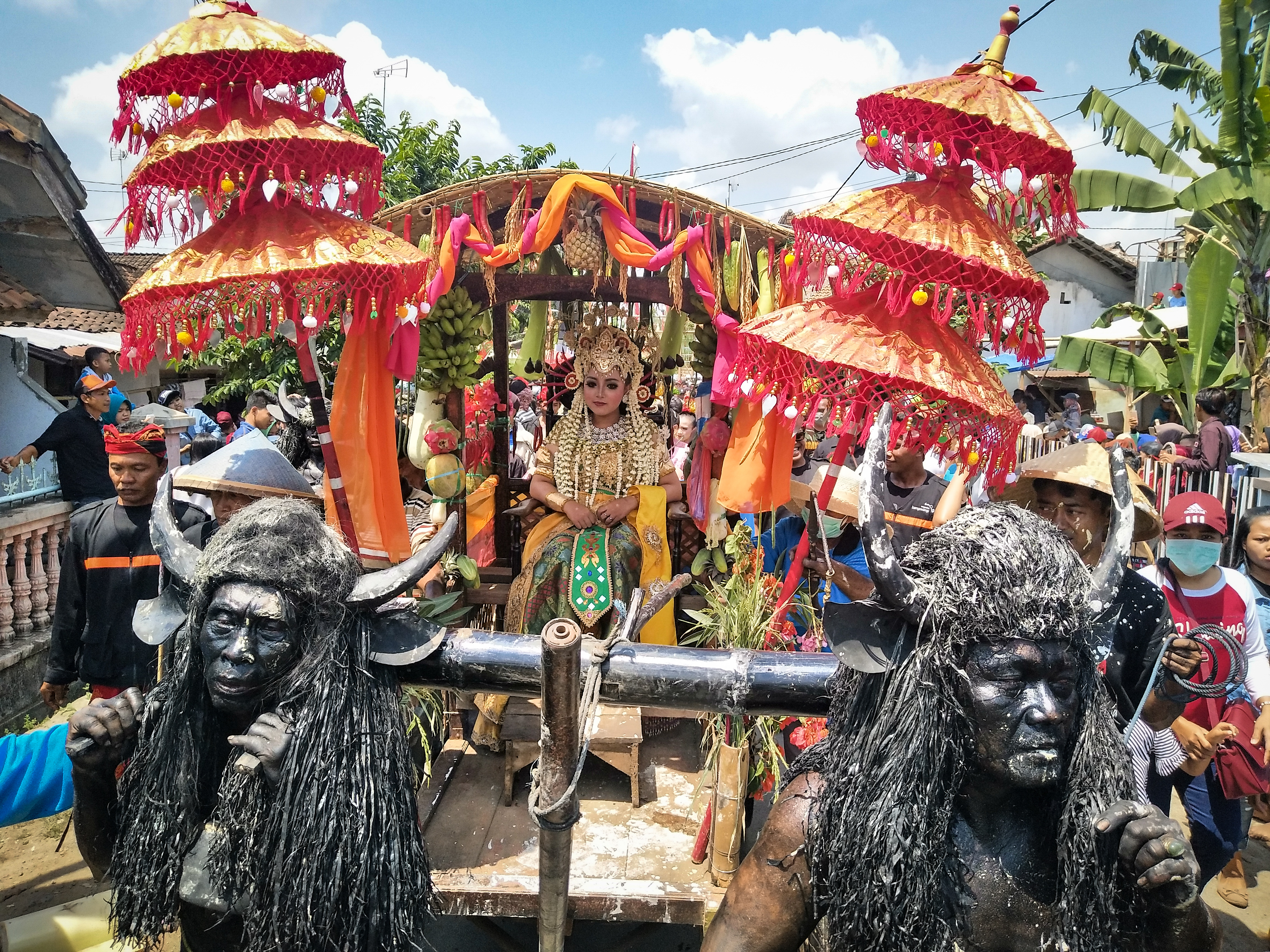
Ngider Bumi ceremony in Banyuwangi. Dewi Sri as a rice goddess riding on a stretcher pulled by two people dressed as water buffalo.

Among the rural Javanese, there is the folk-tradition if a snake has entered a house, it will not be chased away. Instead, the people in the house will give it offerings, as the snake is a good omen of a successful harvest. Additionally, a ceremonial or auspicious keris will be employed by a folk-healer, sooth-sayer, paranormal or shaman in a winding, circum-ambulatory ceremony to bless and protect the villagers, the village, their shrines and the seeds of rice to be planted.

The Javanese and Sundanese have a traditional ceremony called mapag Sri prior to the rice harvest. Mapag Sri literary means "to pick up Sri", or to be precise "to call or invite Sri." The ceremony means to invoke the spirit of Sri to come to their village and also as a thanksgiving for a coming successful harvest.

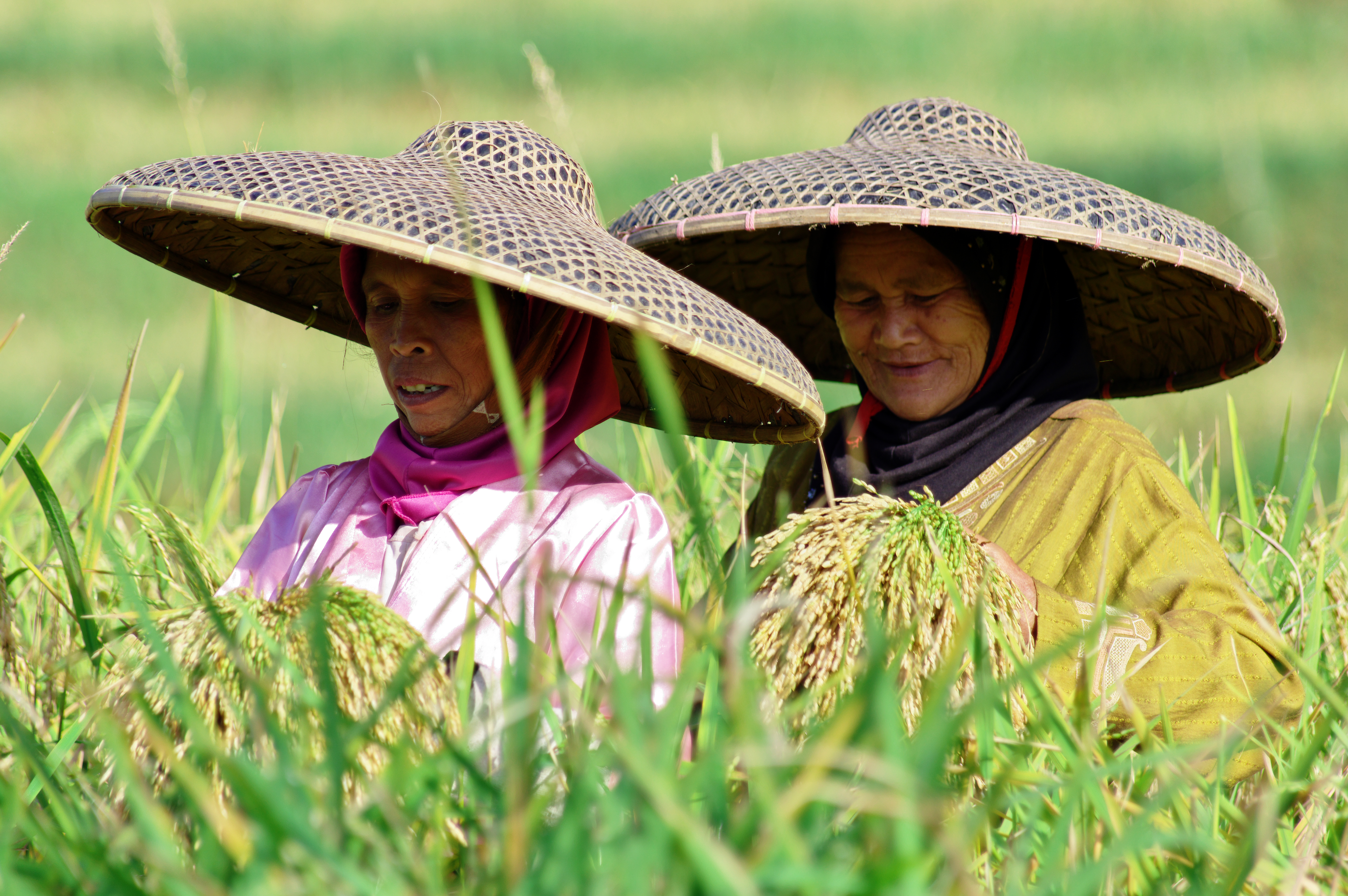
Sundanese Seren Taun rice harvest ceremony.

The Sundanese people, especially those who are observant Sunda Wiwitan, have their own unique festival dedicated to her, such as the Seren Taun annual rice harvest festival, a tradition dated back to the ancient Kingdom of Sunda era. During the blessing of the rice seeds ceremony before planting the seeds or during the harvest ceremony, Sundanese and also Baduy people sing certain songs such as Pangemat and Angin-angin. These songs were meant to call and invite the goddess to come down to earth and bless the rice seeds, bless the farmers, and ngaruwat or tolak bala; to ward off bad luck and to prevent all misfortune from befell upon the people.

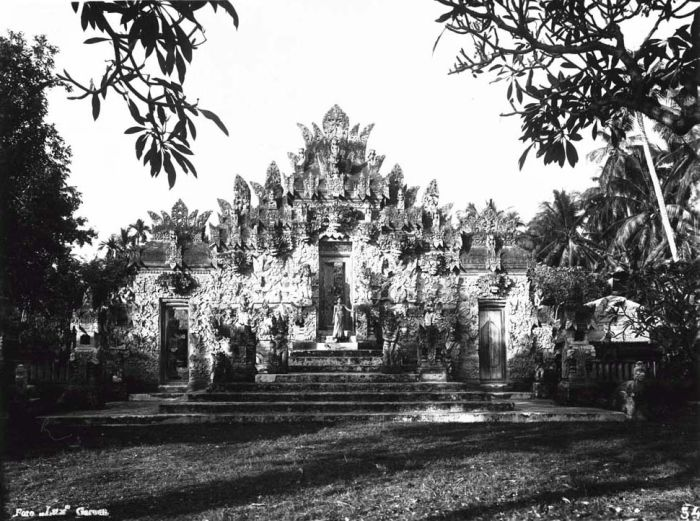
Pura Beji Sangsit in Northern Bali, dedicated to Dewi Sri, the goddess of agriculture.

The Balinese provide special shrines in the rice fields dedicated to Dewi Sri. The effigy of the rice goddess is often made from carefully weaved janur (young coconut leaf), lontar or pandan leaf, or colored sticky rice and is called "Cili". In current Balinese Hindu belief, Dewi Sri corresponds to an amalgamation of the Hindu goddesses Lakshmi, Devi, and Shri. Dewi Sri is venerated in certain Balinese water temple that connected to Subak system, which managing the water allocation for rice agriculture. Shrines were built and dedicated to her, such as in Pura Beji Sangsit of Northern Bali. She is also associated with rice, fertility, successful harvest, and family prosperity and harmony.

Similar rice goddesses can also be found in other Asian countries such as Mae Po Sop; the Siamese rice goddess in Thailand, and Khmer Po Ino Nogar; the rice goddess of Cambodia.

== Gallery ==
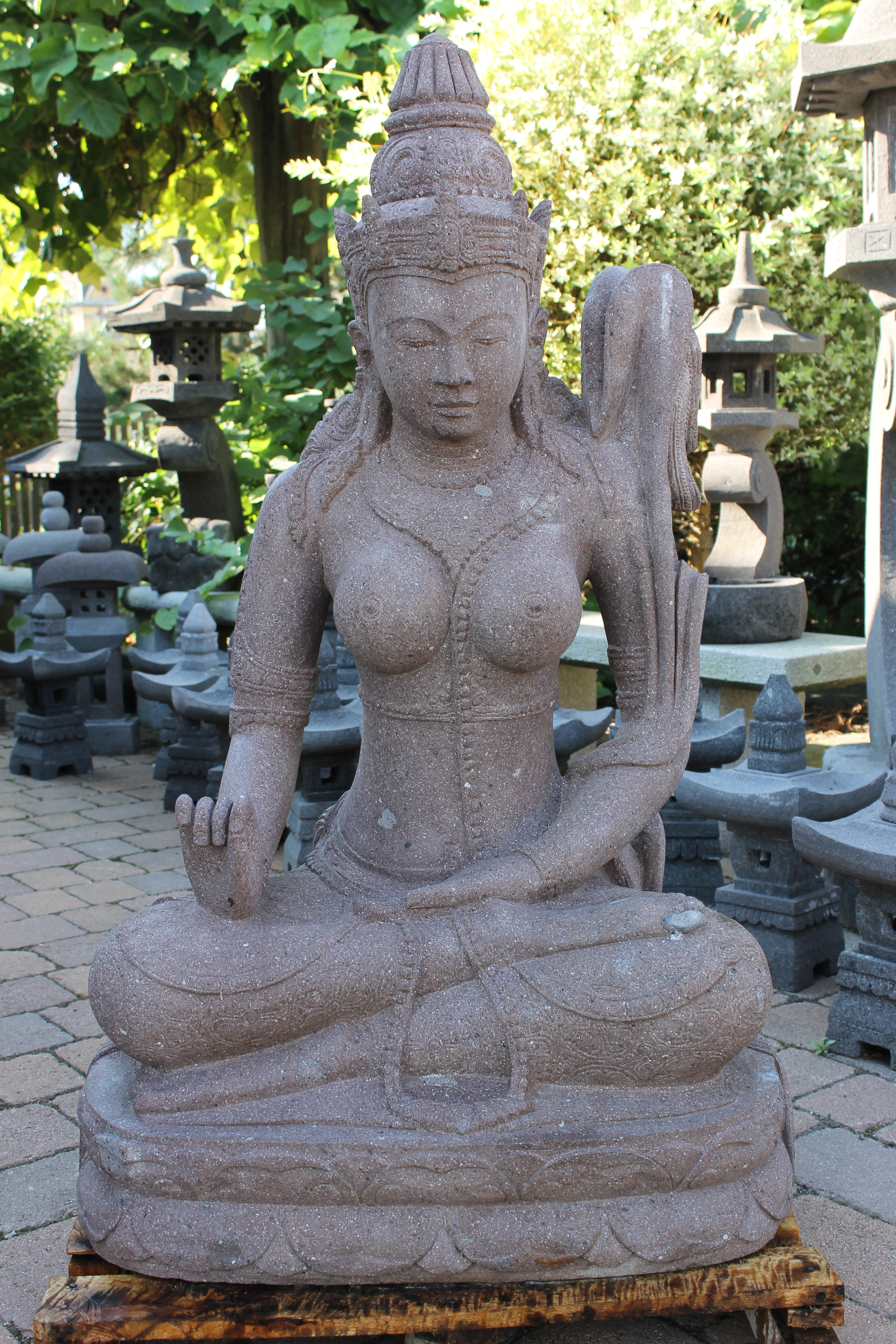
Stone figure of the rice goddess Dewi Sri with Vitarka Mudra

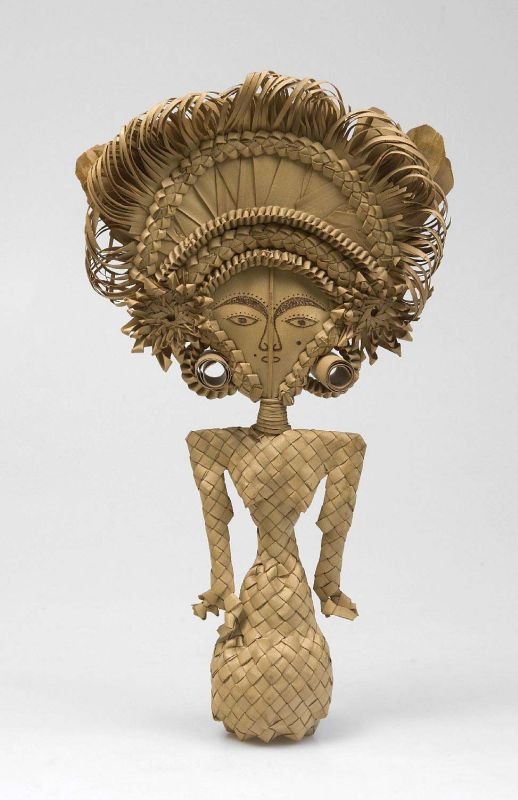
Cili, a Balinese Dewi Sri effigy from lontar palm leaf

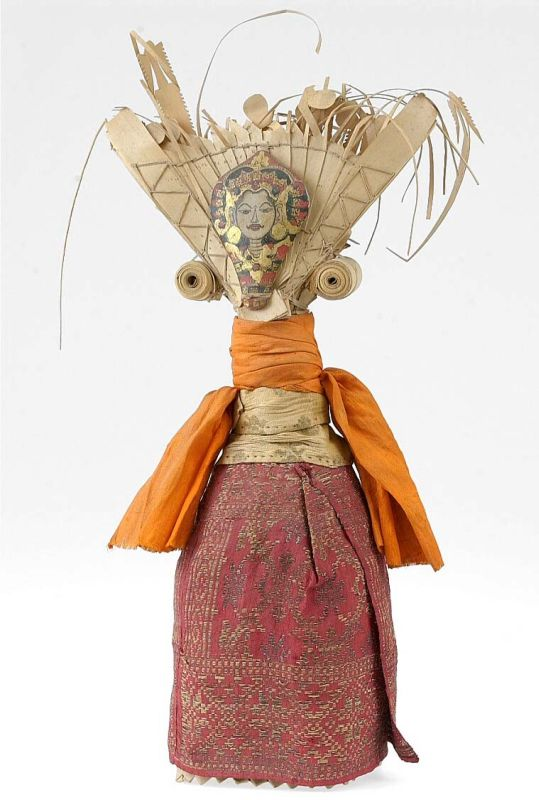
An effigy of lontar leaf representing the goddess Dewi Sri

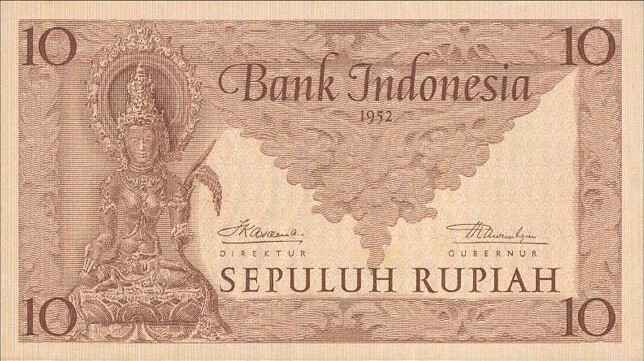
Dewi Sri depicted in 1952 10 Rupiah banknotes

== See also ==
- Nyai Roro Kidul, Queen of the Southern Sea, worshipped by the Javanese, Sundanese and Balinese
- Ceres (mythology)
- Huminodun
- Inari Ōkami
- Nang Kwak
- Phosop
- Ponmagyi
- Shennong
- Tudigong
