= Dewi Ratih =

Hindu lunar goddess

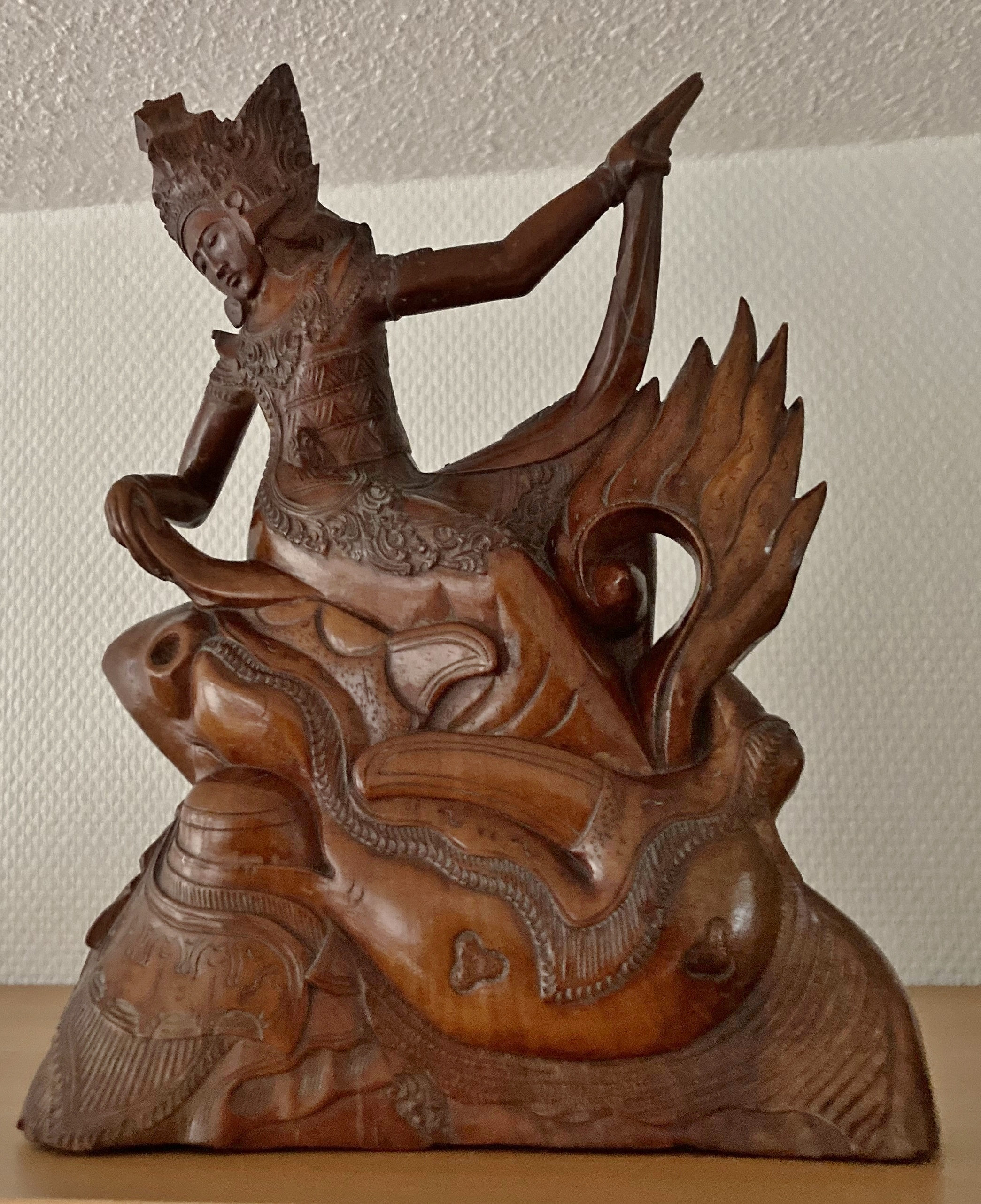
Balinese wooden sculpture depicting Dewi Ratih being swallowed by Kala Rau.

Dewi Ratih, also known as Sang Hyang Ratih or Sang Hyang Semara Ratih, is a Hindu lunar goddess worshipped in Java and Bali. She is well known for her beauty and grace, thus she was also known as the Goddess of Beauty. Her myth is linked to lunar eclipses.

== Lunar eclipses ==
Due to Dewi Ratih rejecting him, Kala Rau the giant planned to attack Vishnuloka. When Kala Rau reached heaven in the form of Kuwera, a leading rakshasa who served the Gods, Ratih warned Vishnu that Kuwera was actually Kala Rau. Vishnu beheaded Kala Rau without knowing he had consumed the tirta amerta, a drink of gods that could make him immortal.

Because only his throat touched the tirta amerta, Kala Rau survived with his floating head. When the Moon came, Kala Rau would chase the goddess, and swallow Dewi Ratih in whole. But because he does not have his body, Dewi Ratih would soon emerge from his neck. In Bali and Java, this story is believed to be the origin of lunar eclipses.

== Ceremony ==
In Bali, a ceremony is held every purnama, or full moon, to celebrate the beauty of the Moon. This ceremony also honours Chandra, another lunar god.

== See also ==
- List of lunar deities
- Ratri
