= Batara Sambu =

Deity of teachers in Javanese mythology

In Javanese mythology, Batara Sambu is a deity and the God of Teachers. He is the first-born son of Batara Guru and his queen Batari Uma. Sambu (or Sambo) in traditional Javanese wayang story is a god who rules clouds. He has two wives: Bathari Siwagnyana and Bathari Astuti and his kahyangan (heavenly abode) is called Kahyangan Swelagringging in the southern part of the heavens. His palace is made of copper and his pasaran (Javanese calendar cycle) is Pa(h)ing. Sambu is the ancestor of rakshasa (giants) in Javanese wayang story.
