= Ateng (actor) =

Indonesian actor and comedian (1942–2003)

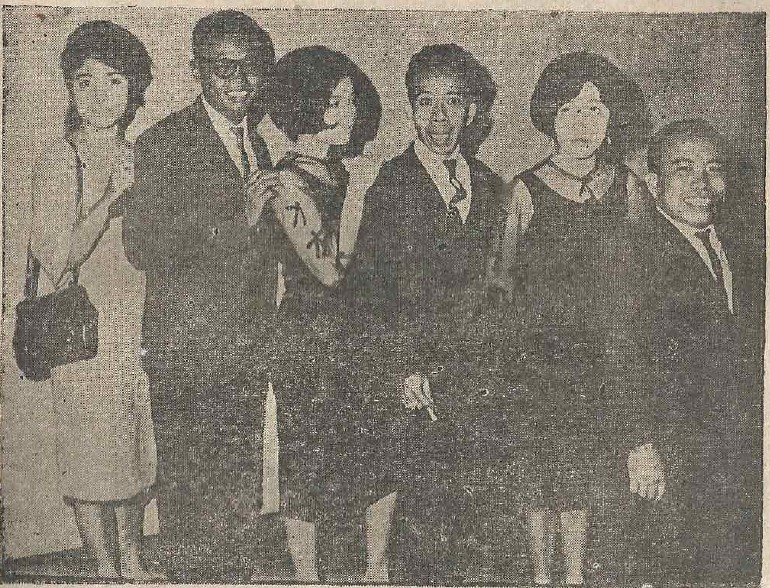
- Ateng (first from the right) with his fellow comedians Iskak and S. bagio
- Born: Kho Tjeng Lie; 8 August 1942; Semplak, Bogor, Japanese-occupied Dutch East Indies
- Died: 6 May 2003 (aged 60); Jakarta, Indonesia
- Spouse: Theresia Maria Reni Indrawati
- Children: 2

Comedy career
- Years active: 1960–2003

Andreas Leo Ateng Suripto (8 August 1942 – 6 May 2003), better known as Ateng and also known by the Chinese name Kho Tjeng Lie (邱诚烈), was a popular Indonesian actor and comedian.

== Biography ==
Ateng was born on 8 August 1942 in Semplak, Bogor, Japanese-occupied East Indies (present-day Indonesia). His father was a merchant. He was the second child of nine children. He studied at Taman Siswa 66 Elementary School, then continued to Taman Siswa 44 Senior High School. He used to be performing at school events. He aspired to be a diplomat so that he wanted to enrolled at Akademi Hukum Militer (Military Law Academy). However he was rejected due to his dwarfism. Finally, he studied at Universitas Nasional's social and political science.

He was involved in the broadcast of RRI's Panggung Gembira hosted by Pak Kasur. Then, he became acquainted with Bing Slamet. Ateng, Slamet, and Dradjat made a comedy group Tos Kejeblos, active in 1961 to 1963. In 1967, Ateng, together with Eddie Sud, and Iskak and Slamet formed Kwartet Jaya.

From 1982–1988 in TVRI's Ria Jenaka, Ateng, Iskak, Suroto, and Sampan Hismanto performed as the clown servants of the hero in wayang, named Bagong, Gareng, Petruk, and Semar.

He played film since 1962. His debut film is Amor dan Humor, starring Bing Slamet and was directed by Usmar Ismail. His other films were Biji Mas, Kuntil Anak, Bing Slamet Setan Jalanan, Bing Slamet Sibuk, Bing Slamet Dukun Palsu, Ateng Minta Kawin, Ateng Sok Tahu, Ira Maya dan Kakek Ateng, Bing Slamet Koboi Cengeng, and Ateng Pendekar Aneh. He also played on Ateng Mata Keranjang, Ateng Koboi Cengeng, and Ibu Tiri Tak Sekejam Ibu Kota. Other comedy films which puts name Ateng in its title were Ateng Bikin Pusing, Ateng Sok Aksi, Ateng Pendekar Aneh, and Ateng The Godfather.

Prior to his death, he played on SCTV's comedy series titled Gregetan. Ateng died on 6 May 2003 at the age of 60 at Mitra Internasional Hospital cause of throat infection.

== Personal life ==
He married Theresia Maria Reni Indrawati, and had two sons named Alexander Agung Suripto and Antonius Ario Gede Suripto.

== Bibliography ==
- Bintang, Ilham (2007). Mengamati Daun-Daun Kecil Kehidupan. Jakarta: Grasindo. ISBN 9789797598778.
- Setyautama, Sam; Mihardja, Suma (2008). Tokoh-Tokoh Etnis Tionghoa di Indonesia. Jakarta: Kepustakaan Populer Gramedia. ISBN 9789799101259.
