= Bego Hill =

Hill in Bantul, Indonesia

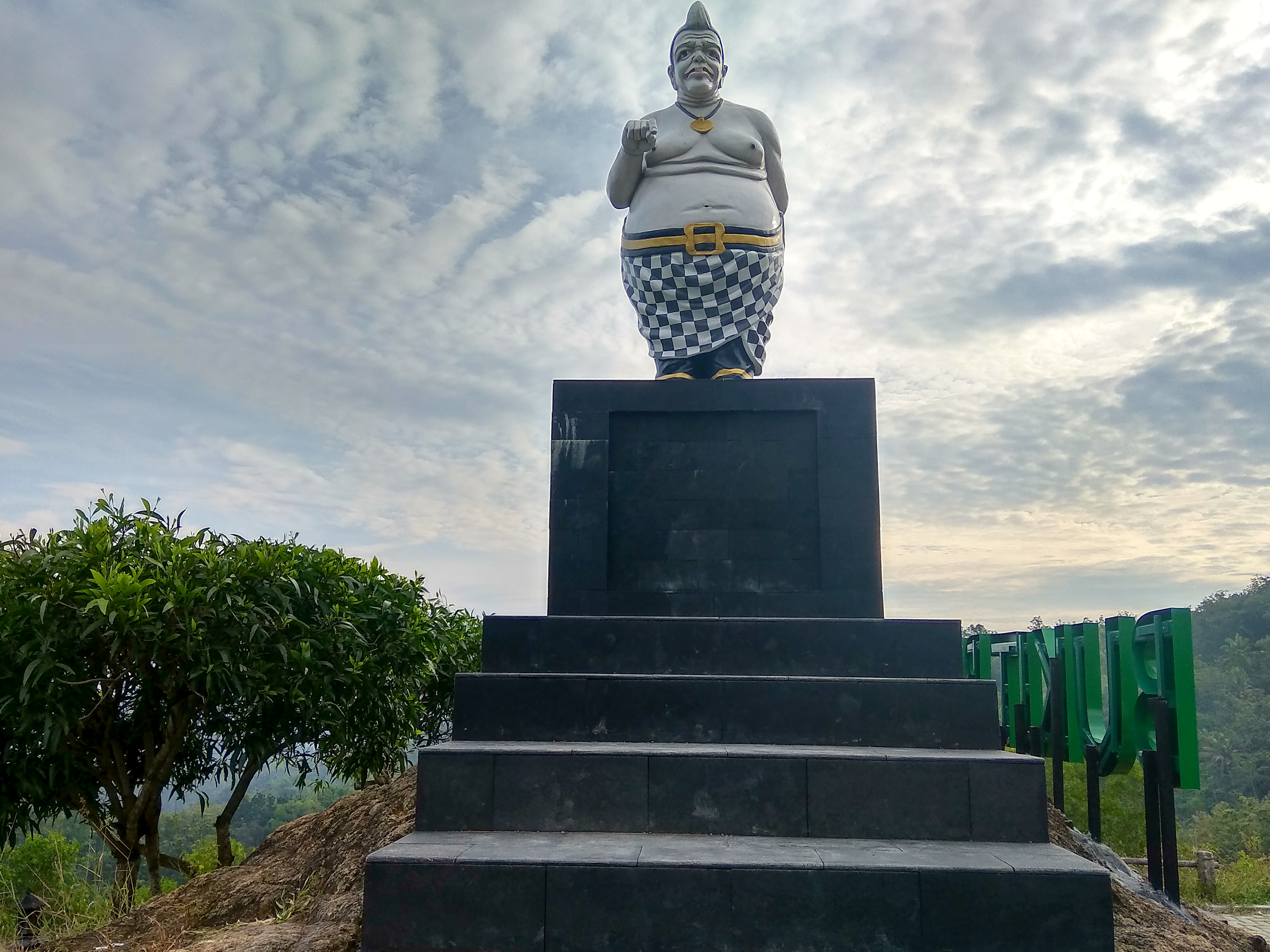
- Interactive map of Bego Hill
- Type: Natural tourist destination
- Location: Imogiri–Dlingo Road, Kedung Buweng Hamlet, Wukirsari Village, Imogiri District, Bantul Regency, Special Region of Yogyakarta Province
- Coordinates: 7.925729°S 110.403209°E
- Opened: 2010 (estimated); 2019 (became popular)
- Operator: Bantul Regency Tourism Office
- Status: Open (all day)
- Facilities: Vehicle parking area; Motocross area; Food stall; Gazebo; Toilet

Bego Hill (Javanese: ꦥꦸꦤ꧀ꦛꦸꦏ꧀ꦧꦺꦒꦺꦴ, romanized: Punthuk Bégo) or Kedung Buweng Hill is a natural tourist destination featuring a hill formed from a soil excavation project. It is located at Imogiri–Dlingo Road, Kedung Buweng Hamlet, Wukirsari Village, Imogiri District, Bantul Regency, Special Region of Yogyakarta Province, Indonesia. This hill has gained popularity in Bantul Regency due to frequent visits by photography enthusiasts and cyclists who stop by to rest and take pictures. Its name originates from a excavator (commonly referred to as bego or beko by locals), used for digging soil.

== Origins ==
The name of this hill comes from an excavator (referred to locally as bego or beko) used for soil excavation. The term is somewhat ambiguous, as "bego" in the local language also means "foolish" or "stupid". Locals also refer to the hill as Kedung Buweng Hill, named after its location in Kedung Buweng Hamlet. The hill itself consists of leftover soil from excavation projects along the Imogiri–Dlingo Road. In the past, the soil from this area was used for backfilling in residential or building construction, which caused the hill to lower over time.

== Location ==
Bego Hill is situated to the east of Imogiri District, approximately three kilometers from Mangunan Fruit Garden. It is also close to other tourist attractions in the Mangunan area, such as Watu Goyang and Mangunan Pine Forest. Specifically, it lies on the main route connecting Imogiri and Dlingo Districts, at km 2.5 of Imogiri–Dlingo Road, Kedung Buweng Hamlet, Wukirsari Village, Imogiri District, Bantul Regency, Special Region of Yogyakarta. The hill is accessible by motorbike and car.

== General conditions ==
The tourist area spans nearly 1.2 hectares, while the original plan involved 2 hectares of land intended for excavation. Before gaining popularity, visitors would come here mainly to enjoy the surrounding natural beauty from its peak. Over time, it became a favorite spot for relaxation and photography. It gained recognition as an alternative tourist destination after being abandoned by miners and repurposed as a resting place for cyclists.

The hill's summit, known as Watu Balung, is unique because it appears to have been cut by heavy machinery. Originally a barren mound left over from excavation activities (whose permits were revoked by local authorities for environmental concerns), the hill now features a Semar statue, serving as its iconic symbol. While not fully managed by local government authorities, Bego Hill has adequate facilities such as parking lots, gazebos, and restrooms.

On certain days, the hill is used by motocross communities for practice. Kasdi, a local resident, explains that the hill's rocky and steep terrain makes it an ideal track for motocross. Visitors can enjoy both sunrise and sunset views from the hill, along with panoramic views of the surrounding nature. Additionally, the Astana Pajimatan Himagiri and Pajimatan Imogiri Mosque are visible from its summit. As of 2025, entry to Bego Hill does not require an admission fee, though parking fees for motorcycles and cars apply.

== Gallery ==
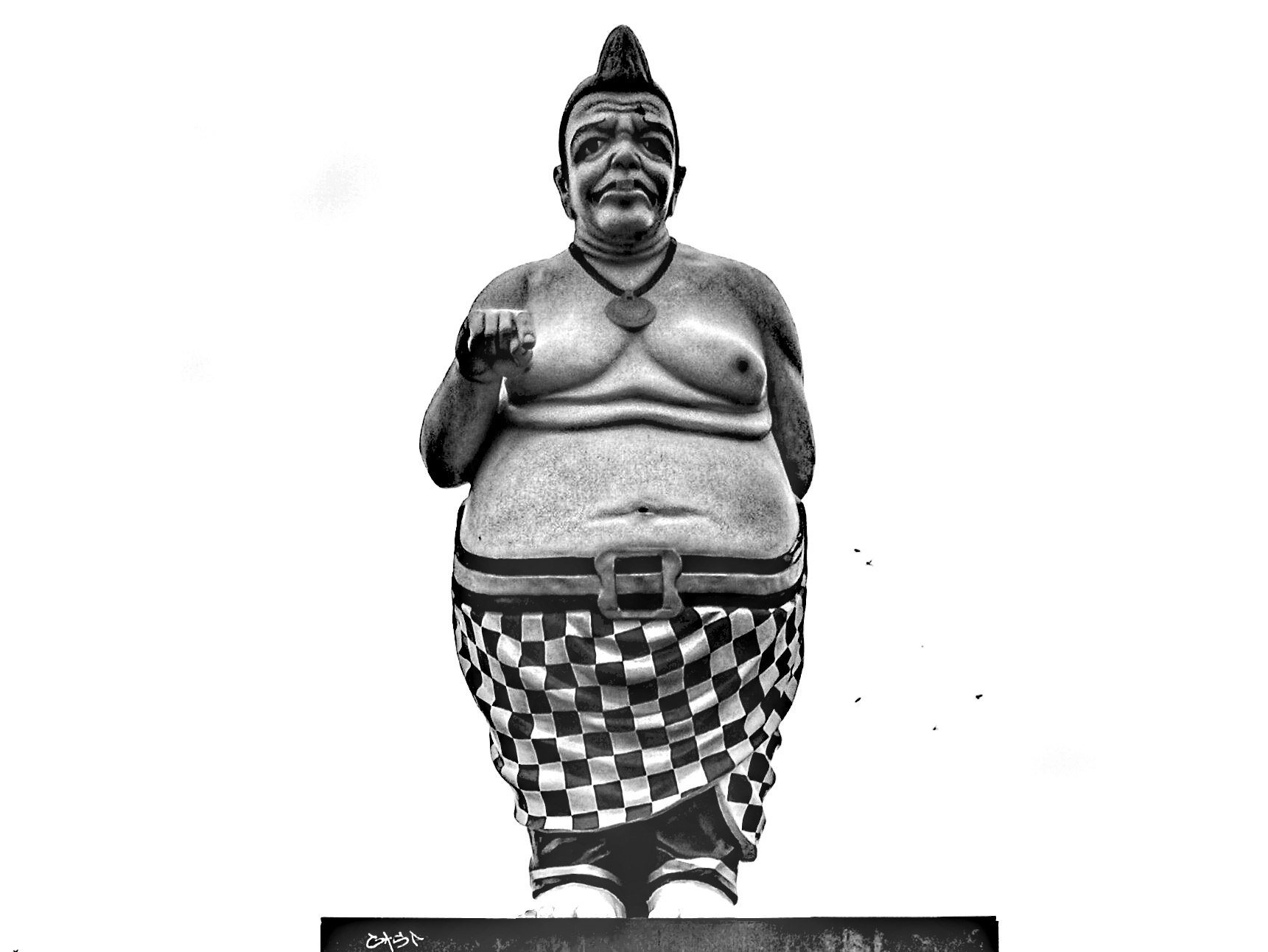
Sketch of the Semar statue at Bego Hill.

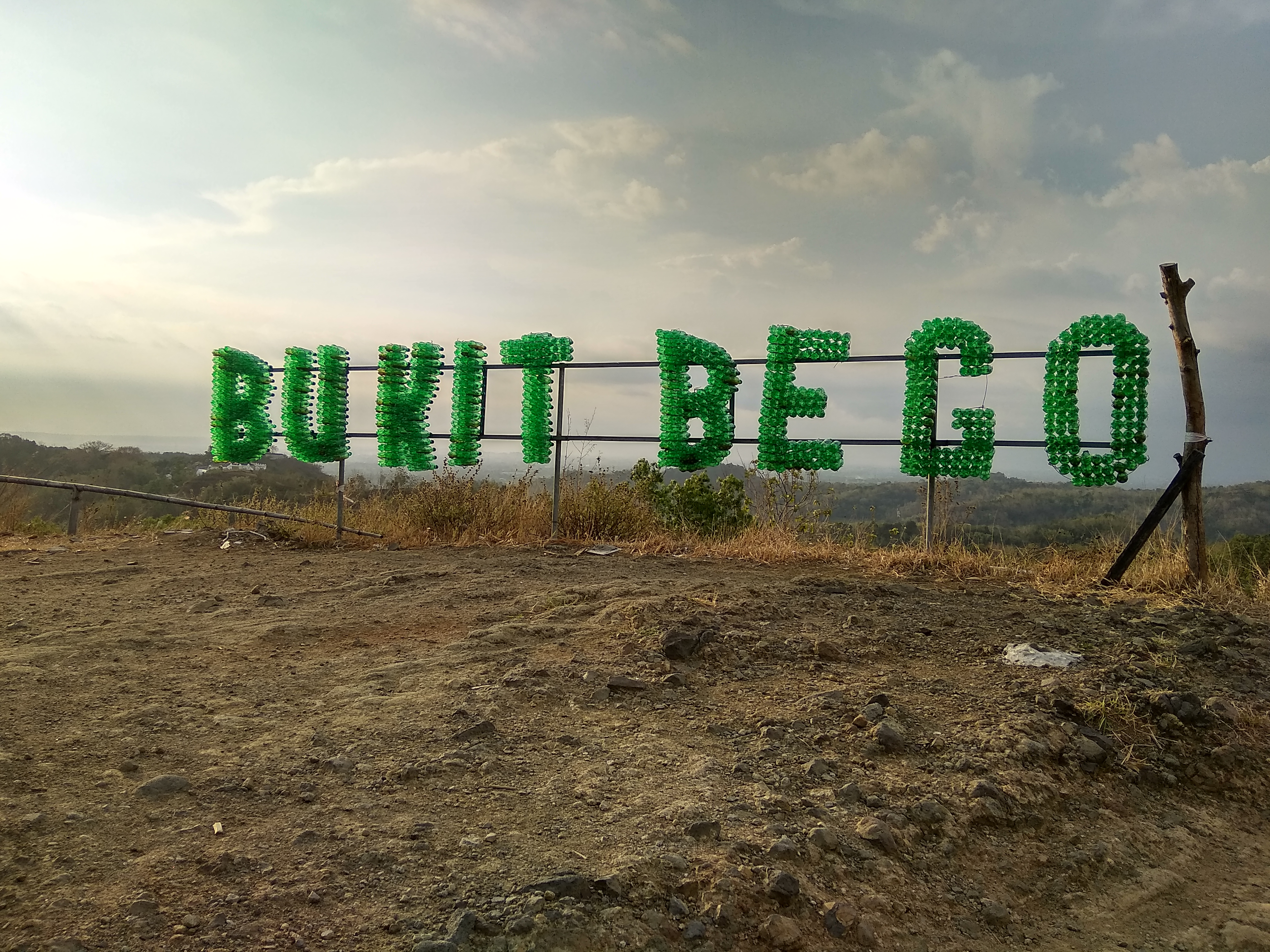
Location marker made of plastic bottle waste.

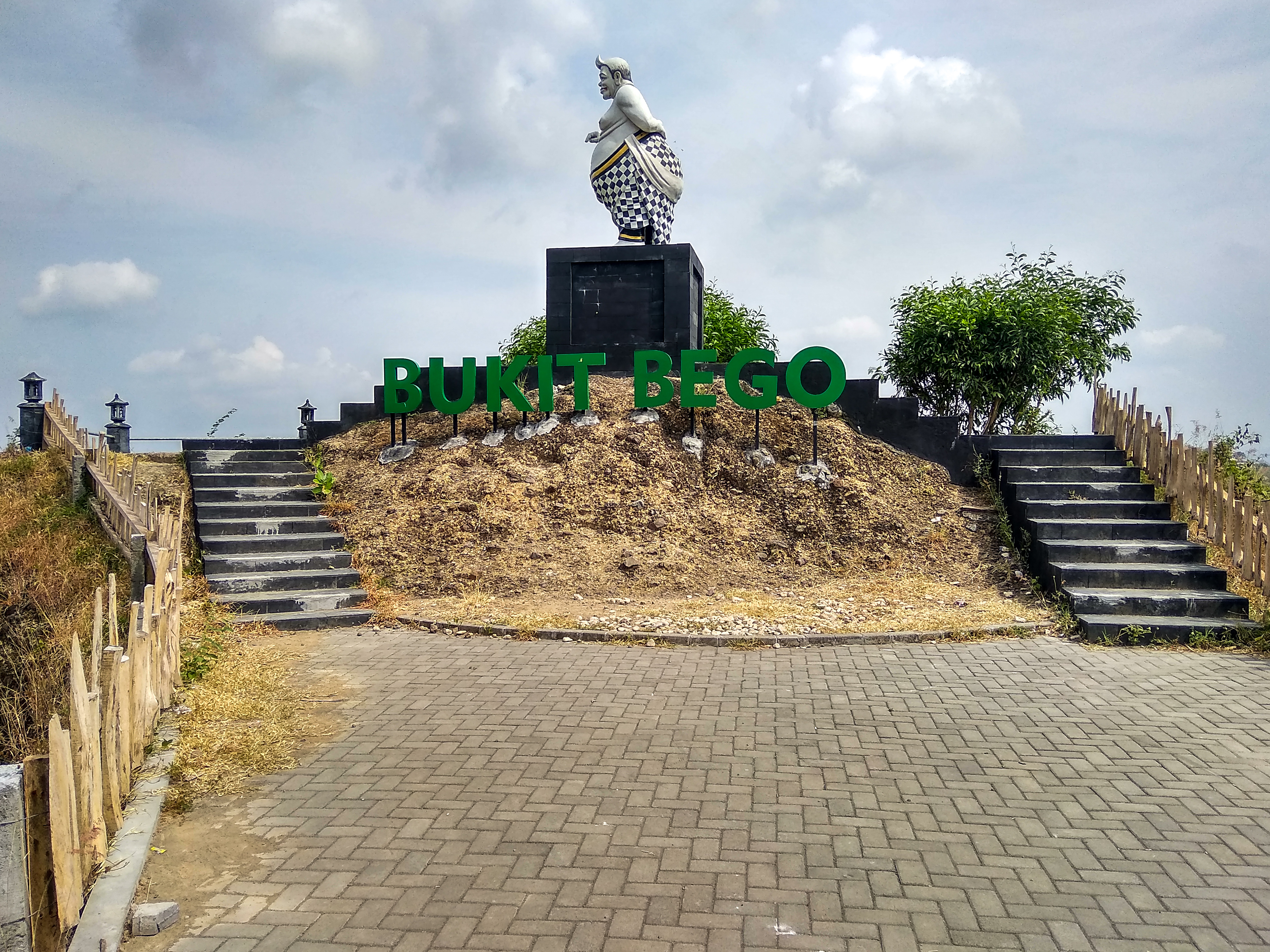
The iconic Semar statue at Bego Hill.

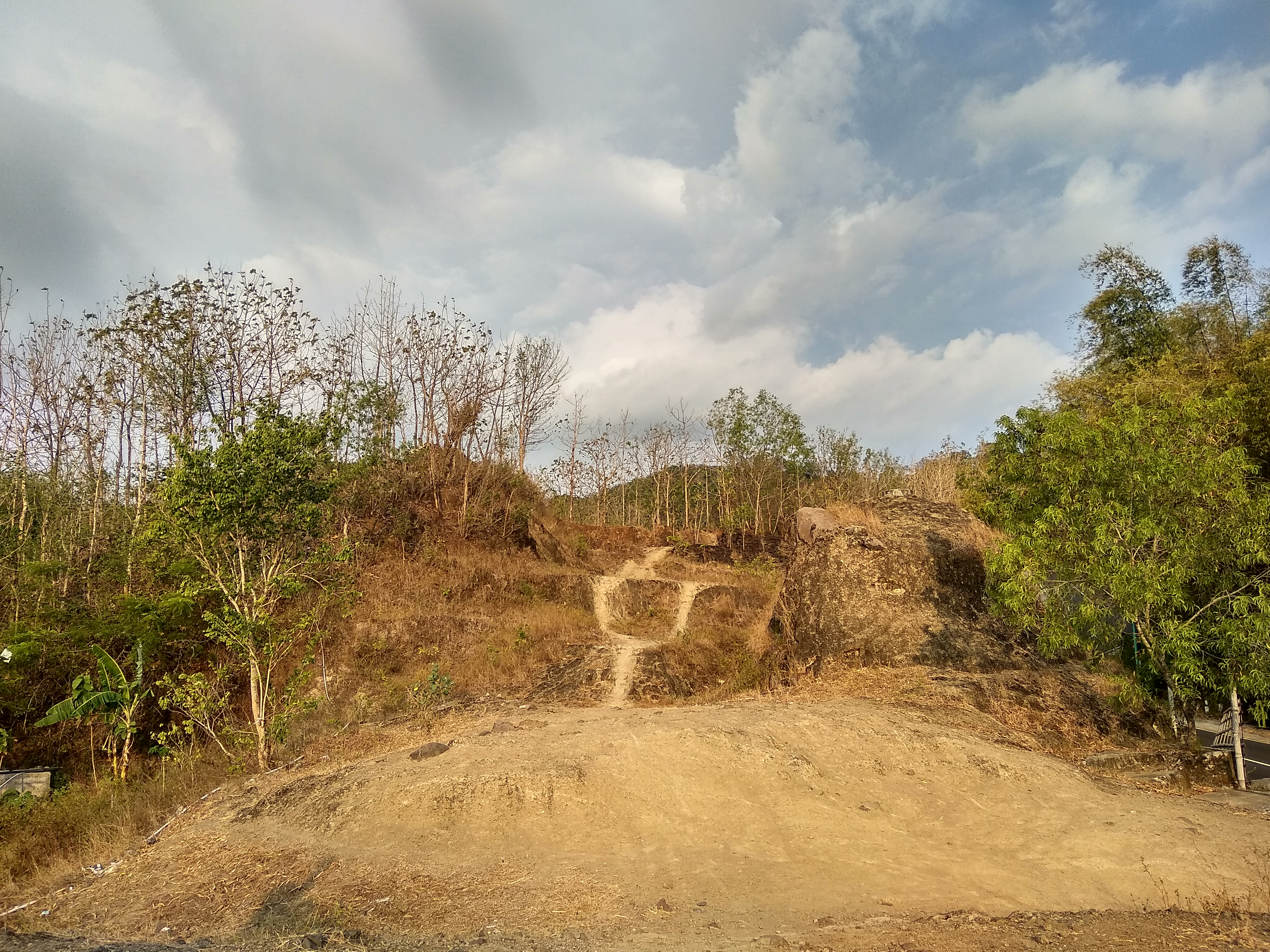
Motocross tracks at Bego Hill.

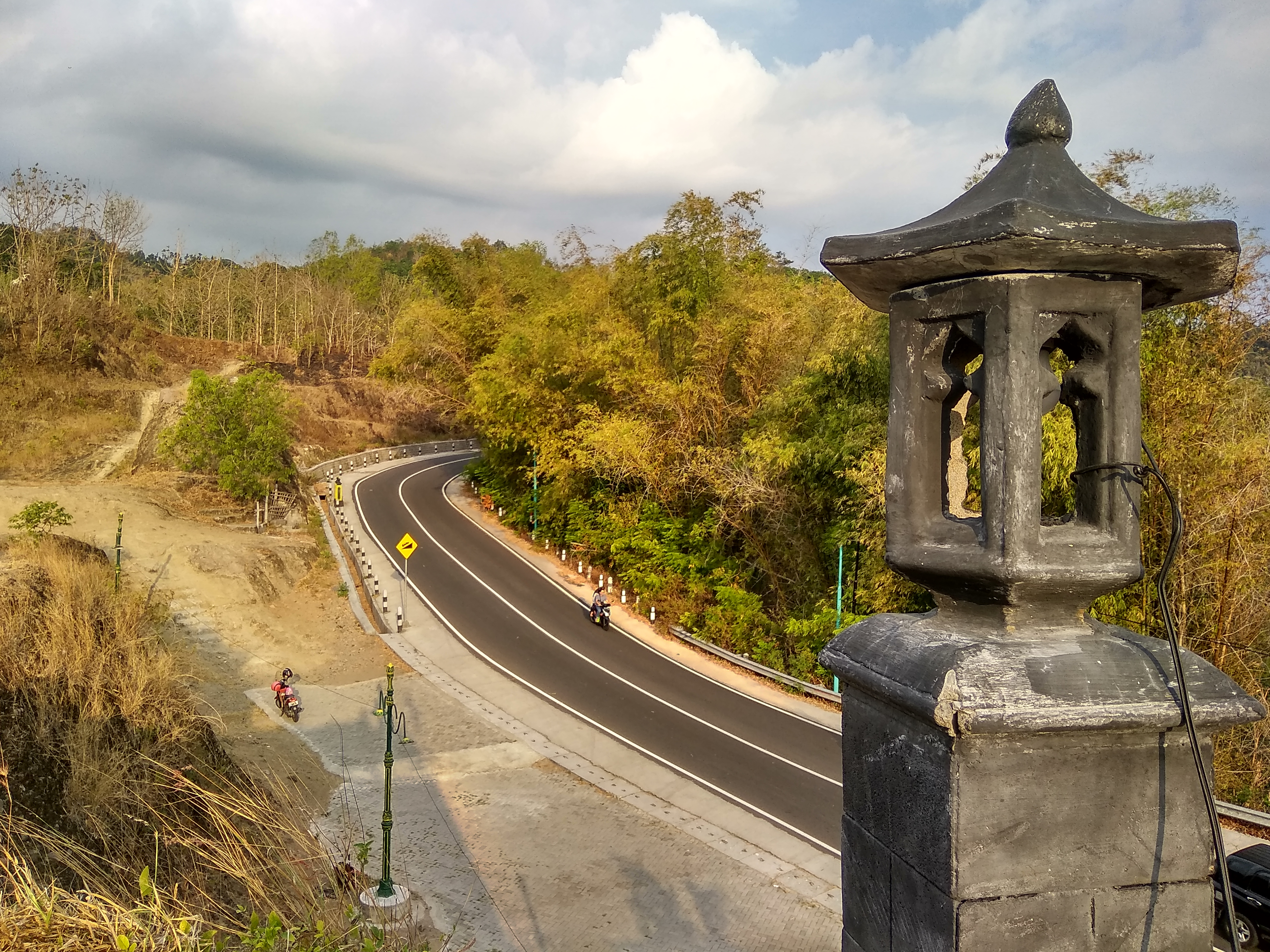
View of the Imogiri–Dlingo Road from the hill's peak.
