= Ibu Kasur =

Indonesian songwriter (1926–2002)

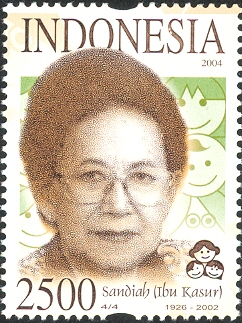
- Born: Sandiah; January 16, 1926; Batavia, Dutch East Indies
- Died: October 22, 2002 (aged 76); Jakarta, Indonesia
- Other name: Ibu Kasur
- Education: Meer Uitgebreid Lager Onderwijs (MULO)
- Spouse: Soerjono
- Children: 5

Sandiah, also known as Ibu Kasur (January 16, 1926 – October 22, 2002), was an Indonesian artist, television presenter, and educator.

== Life ==
Together with Pak Kasur, she hosted the Taman Indria program on TVRI. When private television appeared in the early 1990s, Ibu Kasur appeared in the Hip Hip Ceria quiz show on RCTI.

She founded Mini Kindergarten in Jakarta in 1965. Some famous Mini Kindergarten graduates are former presidents Megawati Soekarnoputri, Guruh Soekarnoputra, Hayono Isman, and Ateng Wahyudi.

Ibu Kasur is also known as a songwriter for children. Her works include My Cat, Clap your hands, and Play Hide. Ibu Kasur was a frequent speaker at seminars related to children. She also led the Setia Balita Foundation, which has five kindergartens in Jakarta and was the editor of a section of the children's magazine Bocil.

== Death ==
Ibu Kasur died at Cikini Hospital from a stroke attack on 22 October 2002. She was buried next to Pak Kasur's grave in the village of Kaliori, Kalibagor, Banyumas, Central Java.

== Family ==
Sandiah met her husband as they were both members of Indonesian Scouts. They were married in Yogyakarta on 29 July 1946.
