= Prambanan Ramayana Ballet =

Drama performances held at Prambanan Temple with the theme of the Ramayana story

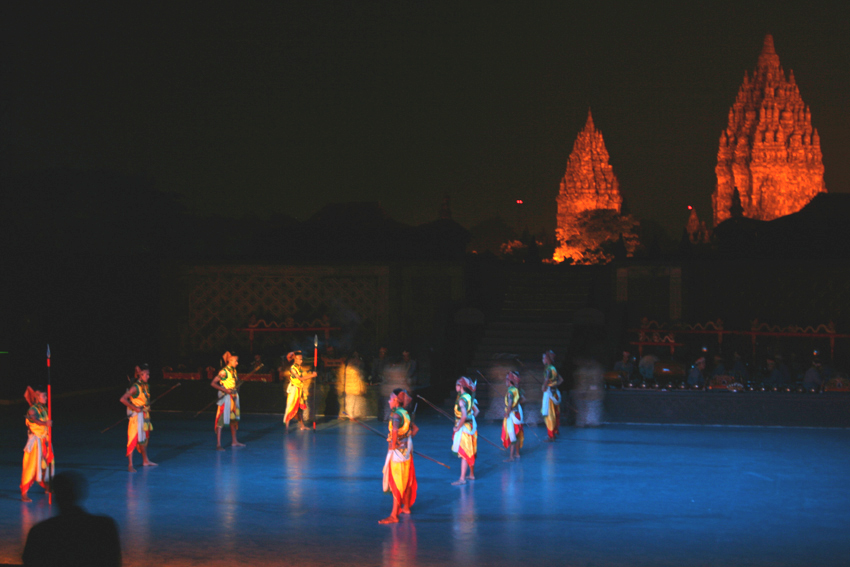
Ramayana Ballet at Prambanan temple.

Ramayana Ballet Prambanan is a visualization of Kakawin Ramayana, Javanese version of Ramayana story, performed near the Prambanan temple, Indonesia. Despite the name, the Ramayana Ballet has no relation to Western classical ballet; it is rather a form of wayang wong.

== Episodic story ==
The entire Ramayana story consist of four episodes and full story, each night one episode, in four clear night and full moon each month May through October, of which (1) First, the Abduction of Dewi Sita, (2) Second, Hanuman on fire, (3) Third, death of Kumbakarna, and (4) the last, Rama meet Sita.

== See also ==
- Ballet music
- History of ballet
