= Nano Riantiarno =

Indonesian actor and director (1949–2022)

- Born: Norbertus Riantiarno; 6 June 1949; Cirebon, State of Pasundan
- Died: 20 January 2023 (aged 73); South Jakarta, Jakarta, Indonesia
- Education: Akademi Teater Nasional Indonesia; Driyarkara School of Philosophy
- Occupations: Director; actor; playwright
- Years active: 1971–????
- Notable work: Semar Gugat
- Awards: SEA Write Award (1998)

Norbertus Riantiarno (better known as Nano Riantiarno or N. Riantiarno; 6 June 1949 – 20 January 2023) was an Indonesian actor, director, and playwright. While in high school, he studied under Teguh Karya and acted in several movies and plays, until he eventually established his own theatre troupe, Teater Koma, in 1977. His works, with their highly political messages, were often censored by Suharto's New Order government. In 1998 he won the SEA Write Award for his play Semar Gugat.

== Biography ==
Riantiarno was born in Cirebon, State of Pasundan on 6 June 1949, to M. Albertus Sumardi, a railway employee, and Agnes Artini; his twin brother was named Pujo Purnomo. He attended State Elementary School IV from 1955 to 1961, followed by State Junior High School II from 1961 to 1964. He then studied at State Senior High School I and II; during this time, he joined the Tunas Tanah Air troupe and read poetry at the local RRI station. After graduating from high school, Riantiarno left for Jakarta to attend the Indonesian National Theatre Academy. At the academy, he studied Constantin Stanislavski's theories on realism and took an unregistered course under Teguh Karya. After the course was banned, he assisted Karya in the founding of the troupe Teater Populer, where he continued to practice acting under Karya's leadership. He also took up playwrighting and directing during this time.

While working with Karya, Riantiarno performed in several plays and films. His credits with Teater Populer include Shakespeare's Macbeth, Tennessee Williams' The Glass Menagerie, Karel Čapek's The White Disease, and his own Doa Natal (Christmas Prayer). Riantiarno also acted in several of Karya's films, including Cinta Pertama (First Love) and Kawin Lari (Elope).

In 1971, he began studying at the Driyarkara School of Philosophy, and in 1975 he left Teater Populer to travel throughout the archipelago and see various forms of traditional Indonesian theatre and other forms of folk art, including wayang and ketoprak.

Finishing his travels, Riantiarno founded Teater Koma on 1 March 1977, with Rumah Kertas (Paper House) being its first production. The title of the troupe was drawn from Riantiarno's belief that "theater is a journey without periods but filled with commas". After taking a six-month hiatus to study at the International Writing Program in Iowa City, Iowa, in 1978, his troupe produced the well-received Maaf, Maaf, Maaf (Sorry, Sorry, Sorry). Another play, JJ, followed in 1979. During this period, the New Order government banned plays with "dissident" themes, often arbitrarily picking up for questioning those playwrights and writers it deemed potential dissidents. Riantiarno himself experienced repression several times, with his 1985 play Opera Kecoa (Cockroach Opera, depicting prostitutes, transsexuals, and corrupt officials) causing all of his subsequent plays to require explicit permission from the government before being performed.

Another of his plays, 1988's Sampek Engtay (based on the Chinese legend Butterfly Lovers), ran afoul of the New Order's discriminatory practices. Due to numerous pieces of legislation limiting Chinese Indonesian culture, the use of Chinese symbols was forbidden, as was the traditional barongsai (lion dance). Two years later Riantiarno was interrogated in response to his play Suksesi (Succession), which touched on themes of nepotism.

In 1995, Riantiarno wrote Semar Gugat (Semar Accuses), using characters, such as Semar, from Javanese wayang. He received a SEA Write Award in 1998 for the work.

After the fall of Suharto in 1998, Riantiarno's plays continued to contain political messages. Opera Sembelit (The Constipation Opera) dealt with "overbloated leadership", while Republik Bagong (Bagong's Republic) is a satire of inept leadership and an overabundance of political parties set in a wayang context.

== Influences ==
Riantiarno was influenced by both traditional and Western theatre styles.

== Personal life ==
On 28 and 29 July 1978, Riantiarno married actress Ratna Karya Madjid Riantiarno. Together they have three sons. Ratna Riantiarno acts for Teater Koma and is in charge of managing business and production.

In February 2021, a documentary movie called Catatan Tanpa Selesai was made about Riantiarno and Teater Koma.

Riantiarno died at his residence in South Jakarta on 20 January 2023, aged 73. He was buried at the Giri Tama cemetery in Bogor a day after his death.

== Productions ==
Riantiarno has produced numerous plays, including:

- Rumah Kertas (Paper House, 1977)
- Maaf, Maaf, Maaf (Sorry, Sorry, Sorry, 1978)
- JJ (1979)
- Bom Waktu (Time Bomb, 1982, part one of a tetralogy)
- Opera Ikan Asin (Opera of the Salted Fish, 1983, adapted from Bertold Brecht's The Threepenny Opera)
- Opera Kecoa (Cockroach Opera; 1985, part two of a tetralogy)
- Opera Julini (Julini's Opera; 1986, part three of a tetralogy)
- Konglomerat Buriswara (Buriswara Conglomerate; 1987)
- Sampek Engtay (1988, based on the Chinese legend Butterfly Lovers)
- Banci Gugat (Transvestites Accuse; 1989, part four of a tetralogy)
- Suksesi (Succession, 1990)
- Opera Primadona (The Primadonna Opera; 1993)
- Opera Ular Putih (The White Snake Opera; 1994, based on the Chinese Legend of the White Snake)
- Semar Gugat (Semar Accuses; 1995)
- Cinta yang Serakah (Greedy Love; 1996)
- Opera Sembilit (The Constipation Opera; 1998)
- Presiden Burung (President of the Birds; 2001)
- Republik Bagong (Bagong's Republic; 2001)
