= Pak Kasur =

- Pak Kasur in 1958
- Born: Soerjono; 26 July 1912; Purbalingga, Central Java, Dutch East Indies
- Died: 26 June 1992 (aged 79); Jakarta, Indonesia
- Education: Meer Uitgebreid Lager Onderwijs (MULO)
- Spouse: Ibu Kasur

Soerjono (Enhanced Spelling: Suryono, 26 July 1912 – 26 June 1992), better known as Pak Kasur, was an Indonesian educator, entertainer, and songwriter. Born in Purbalingga, he served as a teacher in Yogyakarta and Bandung in the 1930s. In 1950, after fighting as a guerrilla Indonesian National Revolution, he moved to Jakarta with his wife Sandiah (better known as Ibu Kasur). The two established several schools, including a kindergarten that grew to involve a thousand children.

In 1952, Pak Kasur began broadcasting children's programming on Radio Republik Indonesia (RRI), with television broadcasts on TVRI following in the 1960s. These programmes were popular, and he travelled to Europe and the United States to learn more about education outside Indonesia. Pak Kasur and Ibu Kasur continued to operate schools together until the 1990s. In his lifetime, Pak Kasur wrote some 140 songs for children.

== Biography ==
=== Early life ===
Soerjono was born on 26 July 1912 in Serayu, Purbalingga, Central Java, Dutch East Indies (now Indonesia). The youngest of nine children, his father was the assistant to the wedana (district chief). Soerjono was educated through the MULO (junior secondary) level, finishing in 1930, but his family was unable to afford further schooling. As such, he moved to Yogyakarta to teach at the Ardjoena School—a Dutch-run school for indigenous children.

The school funded his education at a normal school in Bandung, West Java, and Soerjono supplemented his income by selling paintings and playing sports. He graduated in 1937, and began teaching again while hosting a children's programme on Radio Bandung. This was disrupted by the Japanese occupation of the Dutch East Indies that began in 1942.

After several years of unemployment, Soerjono became a guerrilla fighter in the Indonesian National Revolution. During this period, he met Sandiah, a volunteer with the Indonesian Red Cross who was fourteen years his younger. The two married on 29 July 1946, and in 1950 they moved to Jakarta, where Muhammad Natsir had offered him a teaching position. The couple had five children.

=== Teaching and entertaining ===
Soerjono and Sandiah took the names Pak and Ibu Kasur ('Mr. and Mrs. Kasur'), which was derived from Soerjono's nickname in the Indonesian Scouting movement. His peers had called Soerjono "Kak Soerjono" or "Kak Soer" ('Brother Soer'); this was contracted to form the word kasur. Together, they established several schools, beginning with a kindergarten known as the Frobel School. This school began with twelve children, but by 1953 had a student body of almost a thousand, including the children of commoners, expatriates, and President Sukarno. Tariffs for enroled students were set based on ability to pay, and funding came partly from benefactors. As the student body grew, Pak Kasur retained a large committee of volunteers to assist with its programmes. The couple later established the Taman Putera and Taman Pemuda schools for secondary students. Several of their students went on to become actors and singers, including Ateng and Lilis Suryani.

Pak Kasur (right) with children in Jakarta, 1953

In 1952, Pak Kasur began hosting broadcasts for children on Radio Republik Indonesia (RRI), which were relayed throughout the Indonesian archipelago. He was at times accompanied by Ibu Kasur, who filled in for him when he was ill. During these broadcasts, children were invited to sing songs and share stories; at times, they staged radio plays. During his production of these programmes, Pak Kasur emphasized the importance of allowing spontaneity, and of permitting all children to become involved in production rather than limiting partipants to children with demonstrated talents.

As a result of his popularity, Pak Kasur travelled internationally on several occasions. He hosted several shows in Singapore, where his RRI broadcasts were also relayed, and performed in Sweden, Hong Kong, and the United States. He also travelled to the Netherlands. Pramoedya Ananta Toer recalled that, during his stops in cities such as Rotterdam, Amsterdam, and the Hague, Pak Kasur was warmly received. He toured several schools, as well as the sets of children's radio programmes. On 24 October 1953, he hosted a broadcast in Hilversum involving dozens of Indonesian and Dutch children.

Pak Kasur expanded to television after the establishment of TVRI in the 1960s, and with his wife hosted the shows Arena Anak-Anak ('Arena for Children'), Mengenal Tanah Air ('Knowing the Homeland'), and Taman Indria ('Sensory Garden'). He was also a member of the Film Censorship Board. Due to his reputation for strict censorship, he gained the nickname "Singa Film" ('Lion of Film') among filmmakers. He wrote several screenplays, including Amrin Membolos ('Amrin Plays Hooky'), Siulan Rahasia ('Secret Whistle'), and Harmonikaku ('My Harmonica').

=== Later life ===
Through the 1970s and 1980s Pak Kasur and his wife continued to operate schools in Jakarta, including in Pasar Minggu through the Setia Balita Foundation. They also ran the Taman Kanak-Kanak Mini 'Miniature Kindergarten' from their home, and Pak Kasur spoke at numerous seminars and training sessions for teachers. He frequently returned to his birthplace in Purbalingga, where he would teach literacy to children. He died on 26 June 1992, and was buried at the Kaliori Cemetery in Serayularangan Village, Banyumas (now Purbalingga.

== Analysis and legacy ==
Pak Kasur believed that children are best taught using methods that bring them joy, as doing so would reduce pressure and allow them to enjoy learning. He perceived Indonesian parents as interfering too much in their children's lives, and was thus was pleased with the approach to education used in the Netherlands, whereby children developed independence more quickly. He also emphasized the need for young children to learn to read to understand. The psychologist Seto Mulyadi wrote that, when teaching children to read the sentence "Kucing di bawah meja." ('The cat is under the table.'), Pak Kasur would demonstrate by placing a live cat underneath a table.

Writing in Tempo, Ni Made Sukmasari and Angelina Tiara Puspitalova described Pak Kasur as legendary for his contributions to children. He was granted the title "Legendary Composer of Children's Songs" at the 2018 Indonesian Broadcasting Commission Awards. Pak Kasur wrote more than 140 songs for children, including "Potong Bebek Angsa" ('Cutting a Duck and a Goose'), "Kebunku" ('My Garden'), "Pelangi" ('Rainbow'), "Naik Delman" ('Riding a Trolley'), and "Balonku" ('My Balloon'). Approximately half of these songs had been compiled in book format by 2024. Pak Kasur received the Satyalancana Kebudayaan from the government of Indonesia.

== Works cited ==
- BSH (4 July 1992). "Memang Ia Sahabat Anak-Anak" [Truly He Was a Friend to Children]. Tempo (in Indonesian). Vol. 22, no. 18. p. 41.
- "Pak Kasur's Entertainment for the Kiddies". Indonesian Affairs. Vol. 3, no. 6–7. Ministry of Information of Indonesia. June–July 1953. pp. 28–32.
- Pribadi, Irfan Teguh (23 July 2018). "Kisah Pak Kasur dan Bu Kasur Mendidik Anak Indonesia" [The Story of How Pak Kasur and Bu Kasur Taught Indonesia's Children]. Tirto.id (in Indonesian). Archived from the original on 19 November 2026.
- Rasyid, Shani Ramadhan (3 February 2022). "Kisah Hidup Pak Kasur, Pencipta Ratusan Lagu Anak Indonesia Asal Purbalingga" [Life Story of Pak Kasur, the Writer of Hundreds of Indonesian Children's Songs from Purbalingga]. Suara Merdeka (in Indonesian). Archived from the original on 19 November 2026.
- Romadhon, Vandi (24 September 2022). "Tapak Tilas Jejak Pak Kasur nan Dermawan di Serayularangan Purbalingga" [Looking Back on the Philanthropist Pak Kasur in Serayularangan Purbalingga]. Detik.com (in Indonesian). Archived from the original on 19 November 2026.
- Sukmasari, Ni Made; Puspitalova, Angelina Tiara (27 July 2024). "Mengenang Pak Kasur: Tokoh Pendidikan Pernah Jadi Anggota Badan Sensor Film" [Remembering Pak Kasur: An Educational Figure who Was a Member of the Film Censorship Board]. Tempo (in Indonesian). Archived from the original on 19 November 2026.
- Yulianti, Tya Eka (26 July 2024). "Mengenang Pak Kasur, Guru dan Pencipta Lagu Anak yang Abadi" [Remembering Pak Kasur, the Eternal Teacher and Children's Songwriter]. Detik.com (in Indonesian). Archived from the original on 19 November 2026.
