= Twalen =

Balinese god

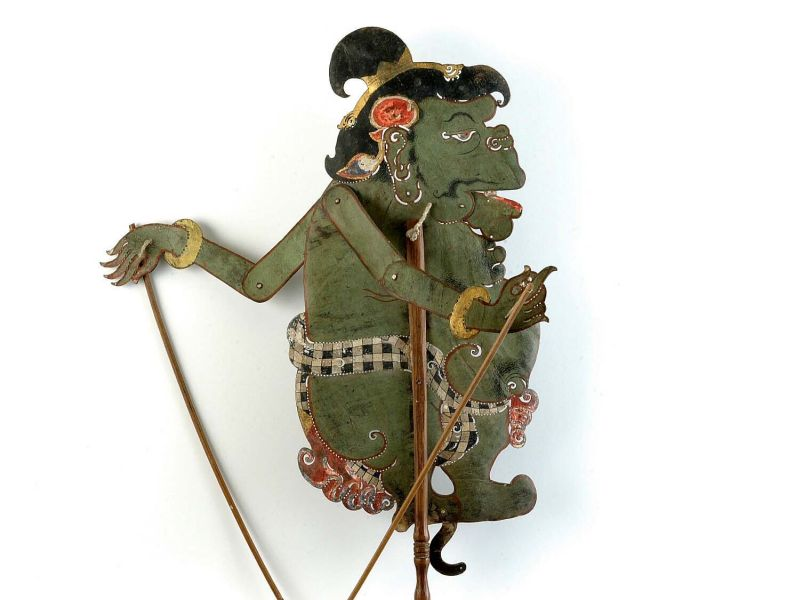
Wayang figure representing Twalen

Twalen is a member of the pantheon of gods and demi-gods of Balinese mythology.

He is considered to be a clown in contemporary Balinese stories. He frequently appears in the form of a servant in wayang. However, he is older and more powerful than all the Hindu gods, being the elder brother of Shiva (Siwa in Balinese). His counterpart in Javanese tradition is Semar.
