= Wong cilik =

Social classification in Indonesia

Wong cilik literally means 'little people' in Javanese, the language of the Javanese people, Indonesia's largest ethnic group. It is a term that refers to a social class in traditional Javanese society that corresponds to commoners in medieval European societies, as opposed to priyayi, the elite, aristocratic class.
