= Petruk =

Character in Javanese puppetry

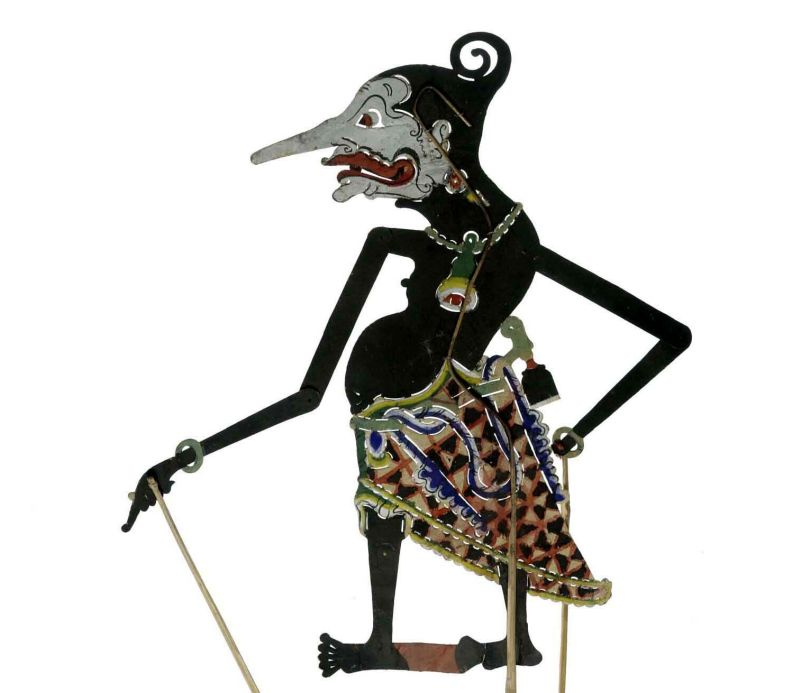
Petruk as a shadow puppet (wayang kulit)

Petruk (Javanese script: ꦥꦺꦠꦿꦸꦏ꧀) is a character in traditional Javanese puppetry, or wayang. He is one of the Punokawan, four comedic figures common in the medium.

== Depiction ==
Petruk is one of the four Punokawan, together with Semar (the leader/father figure), Bagong, and Gareng; Petruk acts as the middle child. They are portrayed living together as a harmonious family. The Punokawan, often referred to as clowns in English, provide comic relief in the stories they are in, but also serve to speak to the audience and convey ideas of the dhalang (puppeteer), including social criticism.

Petruk is depicted as having lengthy limbs and a long nose; his nose is generally considered his most distinctive feature. In wayang performances the dhalang generally provides a "warrior's voice" for Petruk, as opposed to the nasal voice used for his brothers. He is married to Dewi Ambarawati, whom he won the right to marry after defeating four other suitors in a vicious battle. Together they have a son, Lengkungkusuma.

== Literary appearances ==
Petruk and the punokawan, who are not present in the original Indian versions of the Mahabharata, are thought to have been an original Javanese creation. The Batara Ismaya Krama details Petruk's origin as follows. He was originally a noble raksasa known as Bambang Pecruk Panyukilan. He was humorous yet quick to fight, enjoyed joking but was a furious warrior. One day, he departed his home to test his strength. Meeting Bambang Sukakadi, he challenged the latter to fight. The two fought for an extended period of time, until ultimately their entire bodies were covered in bruises and both had lost their once-handsome appearances. The fight was only stopped after Bagong and Smarasanta came together with Semar; Semar ordered the fighting men to stop and join him as his students. Afterwards Bambang Pecruk Panyukilan became Petruk, whereas Bambang Sukakadi became Gareng.

During the Dutch colonial period, a wayang story entitled Petruk Dadi Ratu (Petruk Becomes King) arose as a veiled criticism of the Dutch colonial powers. In this story, Petruk (in the guise of Prabu Welgeduwelbeh) overthrows his brother Gareng to become king of Trancanggribig; he is ultimately overthrown by Bagong, until the kingdom is surrendered to the Pandawa. Other contemporary stories exist as well. In Petruk Ilang Petele (Petruk Loses His Axe), Petruk loses his axe, whereas in Ambangun Candi Saptaharga a woman named Dewi Mustakaweni steals a sacred relic known as Kalimasada, after which Petruk steals it back.

Petruk and the Punokawan can also be found in modern Indonesian literature. In Nano Riantiarno's Semar Gugat (1995), for instance, Petruk appears as a son of Semar who abandons him after the latter loses his powers. Allusions to the character can be found in cartoons.

== Works cited ==
- Anderson, Benedict (1978). "Cartoons and Monuments: The Evolution of Political Communication under the New Order". In Karl D Jackson; Lucian W Pye (eds.). Political Power and Communications in Indonesia. Berkeley: University of California Press. ISBN 978-0-520-03303-0.
- Hermawan, Deny (2013). Semar dan Kentut Kesayangannya [Semar and His Beloved Flatulence] (in Indonesian). Yogyakarta: Diva Press.
- Kresna, Ardian (2012). Punakawan: Simbol Kerendahan Hati Orang Jawa [The Punakawan: Symbol of the Humility of Javanese People] (in Indonesian). Yogyakarta: Narasi.
- Sudibyoprono, Rio; Suwandono; Dhanisworo; Mujiyono (1991). Ensiklopedi Wayang Purwa [Encyclopedia of Wayang Purwa]. Jakarta: Balai Pustaka. ISBN 978-979-407-341-4.
- Tejo, H Sujiwo (26 November 1995). "Angin Litsus dari Semar" [Whirlwind from Semar]. Kompas (in Indonesian).
