= Panakawan =

Figures in Javanese puppet theater

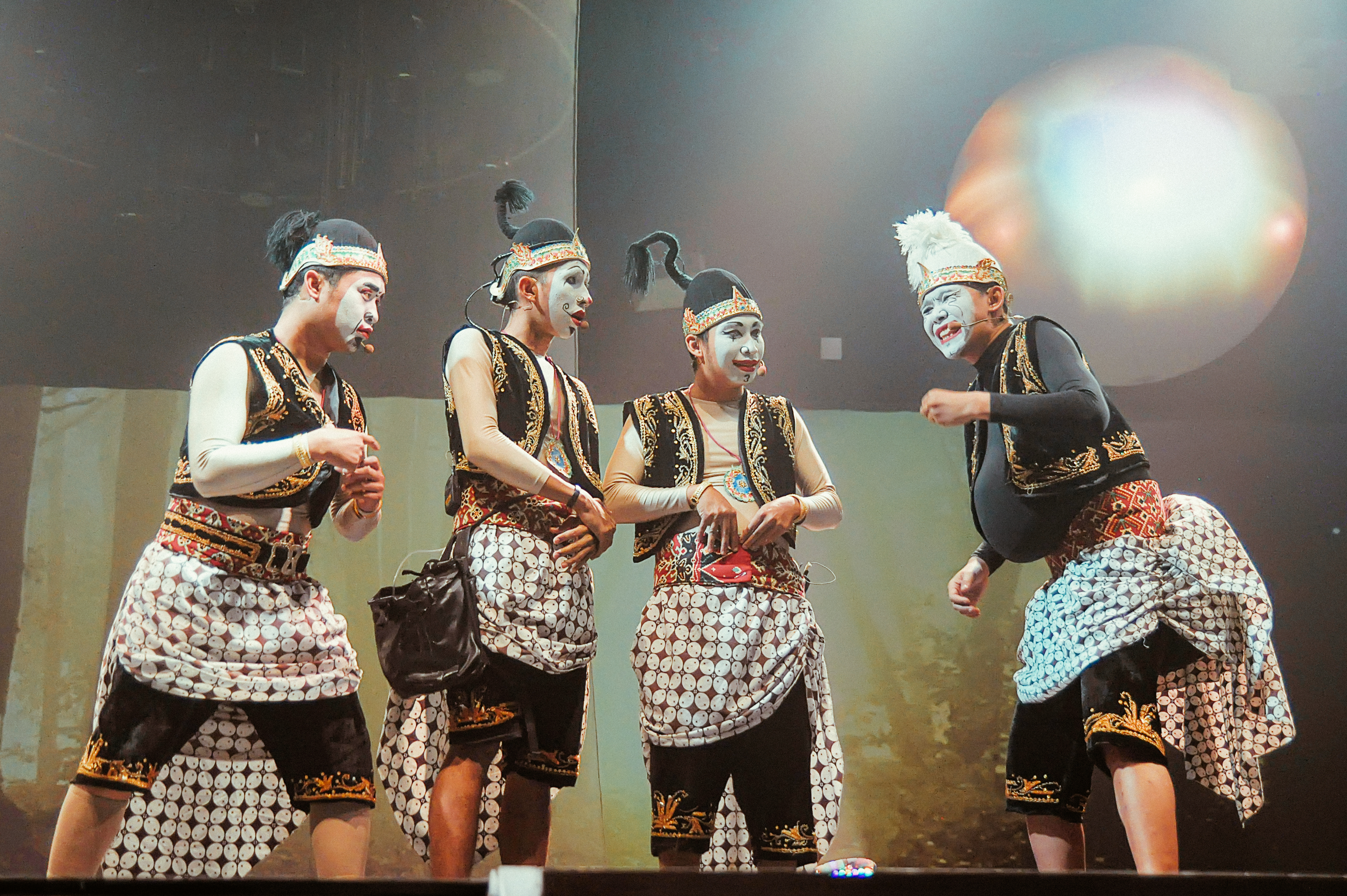
Panakawan (right) accompanied their masters in a traditional wayang wong theater performance in Yogyakarta. September 2013.

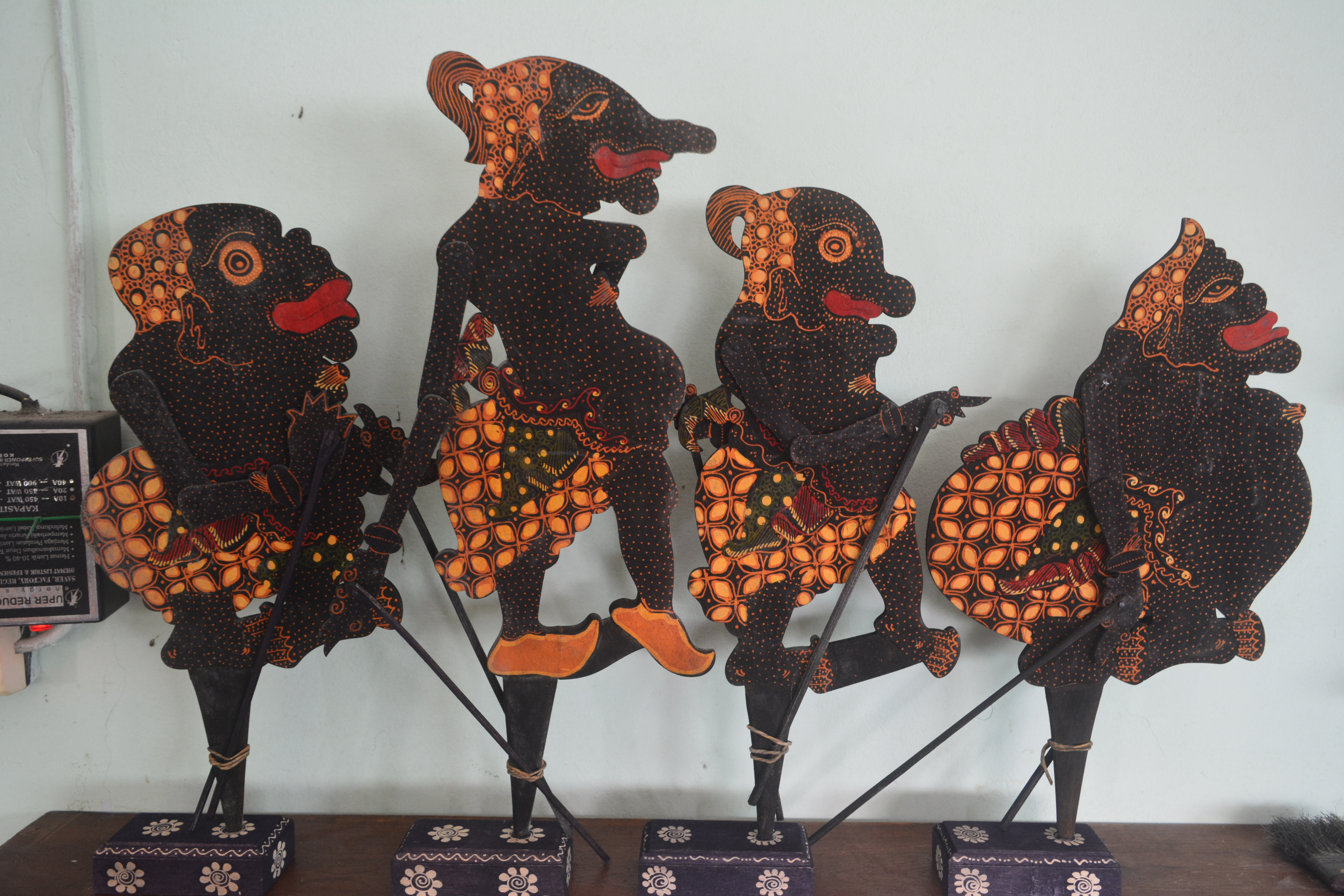
Panakawan in wayang kulit, from left to right: Bagong, Petruk, Gareng, and Semar.

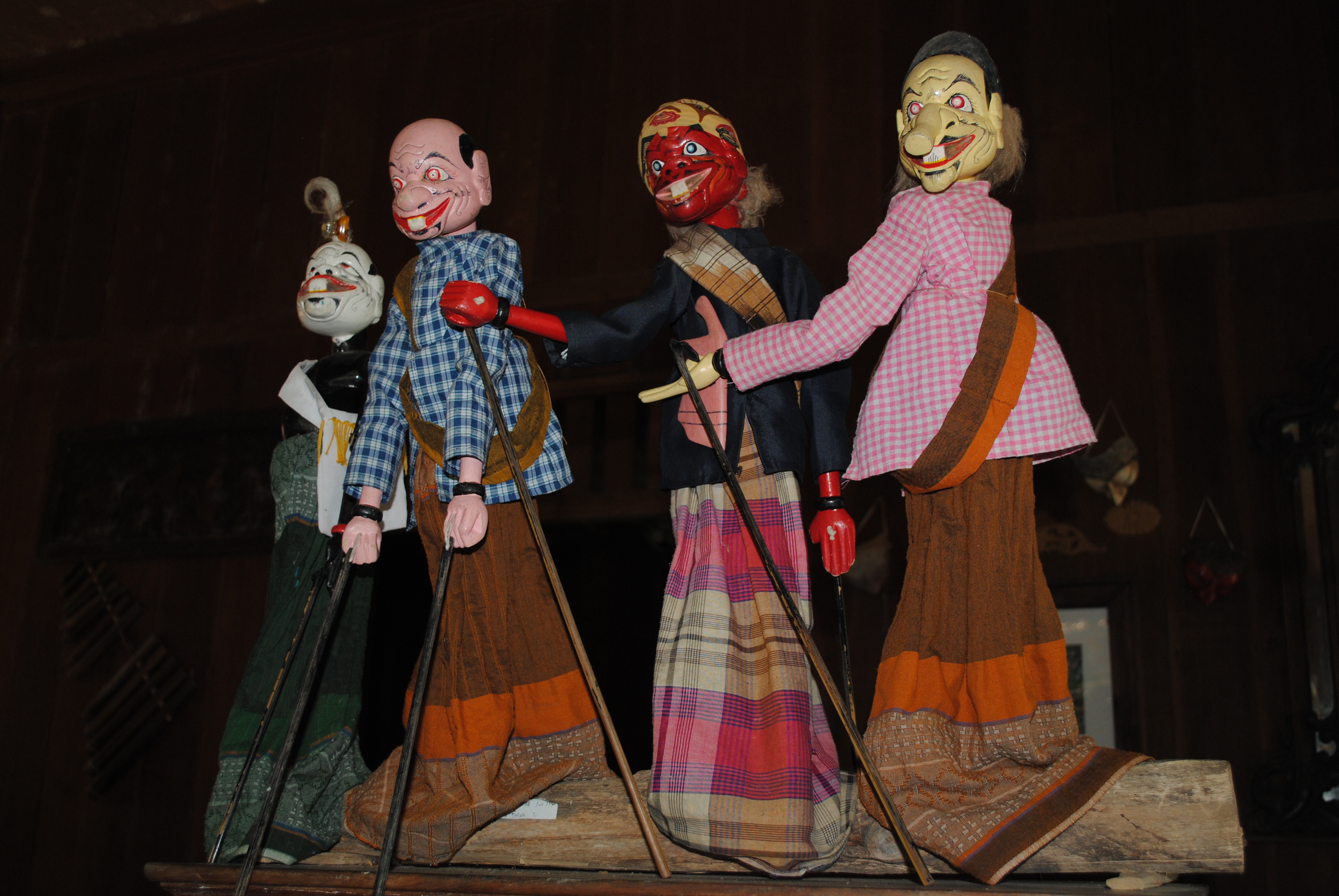
Panakawan in wayang golek, from left to right: Semar, Dawala, Cepot, and Gareng.

In Javanese and Sundanese wayang, the panakawan (Javanese: ꦥꦤꦏꦮꦤ꧀; Sundanese: ᮕᮔᮊᮝᮔ᮪) or punakawan (ꦥꦸꦤꦏꦮꦤ꧀) (ᮕᮥᮔᮊᮝᮔ᮪) are the clown servants of the hero. There are four of them – Semar, Petruk, Gareng (ꦒꦫꦺꦁ, Garèng), and Bagong (ꦧꦒꦺꦴꦁ). Semar is the personification of a deity, sometimes said to be the dhanyang (Javanese: ꦝꦚꦁ) or guardian spirit of the island of Java. In Javanese mythology, deities can only manifest themselves as ugly or otherwise unprepossessing humans, and so Semar is always portrayed as short and fat with a pug nose and a dangling hernia.

His three companions are his adopted sons, given to Semar as votaries by their parents. Petruk is portrayed as tall and gangling with a long nose, Gareng as short with a club foot, and Bagong as obese.

The panakawan always appear in the second act of a wayang performance – pathet sanga – as servants to the hero of the story regardless of who that hero is.

Similar characters appear in other Indonesian wayang and theatrical traditions, including those of Bali and Sunda, under different names.

The panakawan characters are generally much-loved by audiences who attend wayang plays in Indonesia and their appearance in the plays is usually greeted with laughter and anticipation.

== Role ==
The Javanese English Dictionary gives the first definition of the Javanese word panakawan as "follower, servant". In wayang, panakawan are not just mere servants or followers, but they also understand what is happening to their masters. They often act as advisors to their masters.

The most distinctive thing about the existence of panakawan is they act as a group that spreads humour in the story. Their behavior and speech typically invite laughter from the audience. Apart from being comforters and advisers, they sometimes also act as helpers to their masters in times of adversity. For example, when Bimasena has to face Shakuni in the Bharatayuddha war, Semar comes up to inform him of Shakuni's weakness.

In conversations between panakawan, it is common for the language and terms they use to be modern terms that are not following their era. But this seems to have become normal and is not a problem. For example, in wayang performances, Petruk claims to have a car or cellphone, even though these two objects certainly did not exist in the wayang era back then.
