= Semar =

Character in Javanese mythology

Semar ꦱꦼꦩꦂ
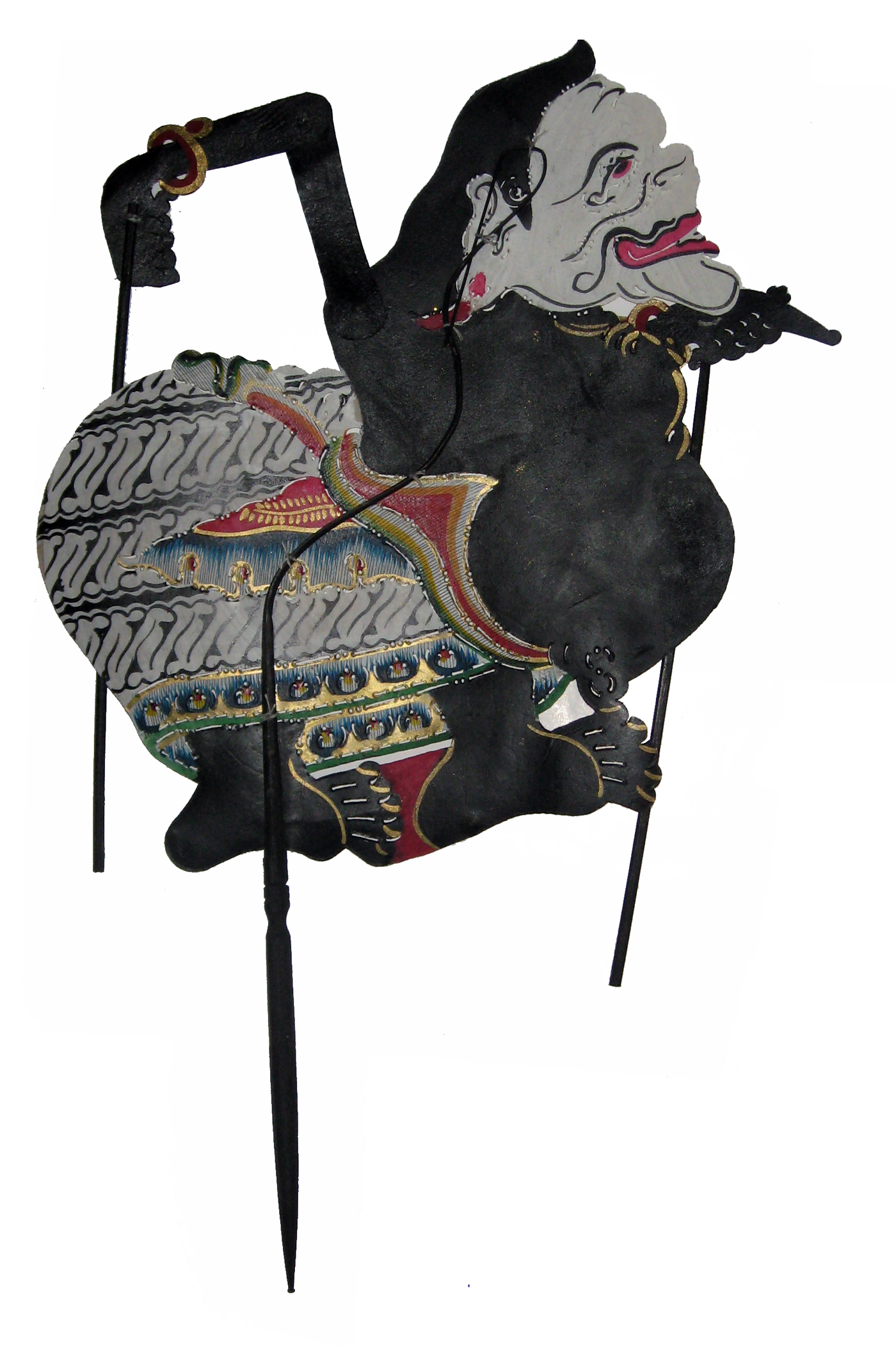
- A Wayang representing Semar

Creature information
- Grouping: Legendary creature
- Sub grouping: Undead

Origin
- Country: Indonesia
- Region: Java

Semar (Javanese script: ꦱꦼꦩꦂ) is a character in Javanese mythology who frequently appears in wayang shadow plays. He is one of the punokawan (clowns) but is divine and very wise. He is the dhanyang (guardian spirit) of Java, and is regarded by some as the most sacred figure of the wayang set. He is said to be the god Sang Hyang Ismaya in human form.

The name Semar is said to derive from the Javanese word samar ("dim, obscure, mysterious"). He is often referred to by the honorific, "Kyai Lurah Semar" ("the venerable chief").

== Description ==
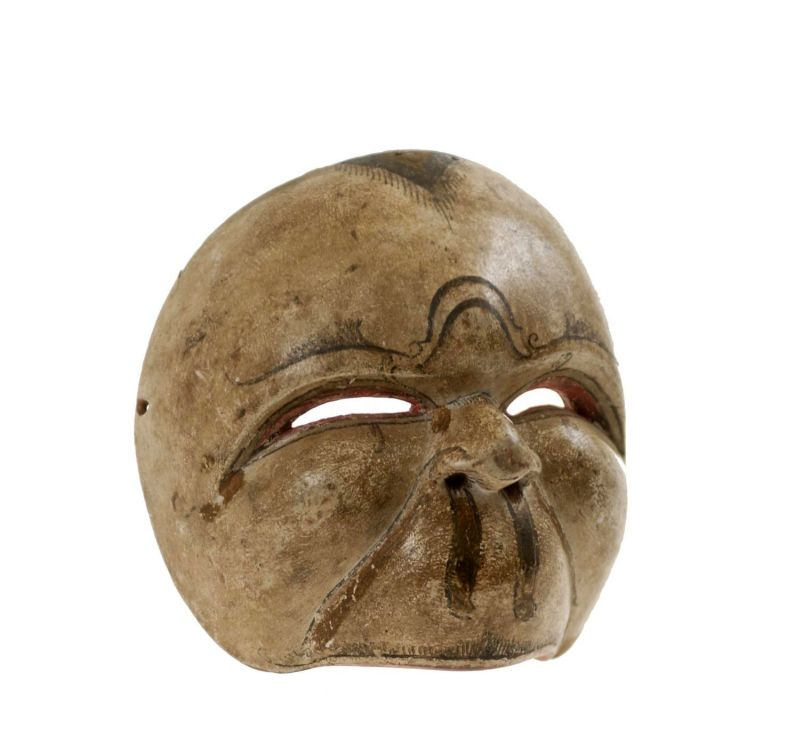
Mask of Semar for traditional Javanese theater performance.

In depictions, Semar appears with a flat nose, a protruding lower jaw, a tired eye, and a bulging rear, belly, and chest. He wears a checkered hipcloth, symbolizing sacredness. Like the other punakawan, the wayang kulit puppet does not have the elaborate openwork and ornamentation characteristic of the heroes In wayang wong, Semar always leans forward, one hand palm up on his back and the other extended partly forward, moving up and down, with an extended forefinger.

By tradition Semar has three sons, the other punakawans in the wayang: Gareng, Petruk, and Bagong (Bagong does not appear in Surakarta-style wayang). In some wayangs, he has a brother Togog (or Hyang Antaga), who is the servant-clown of a demonic hero.

== Origin ==
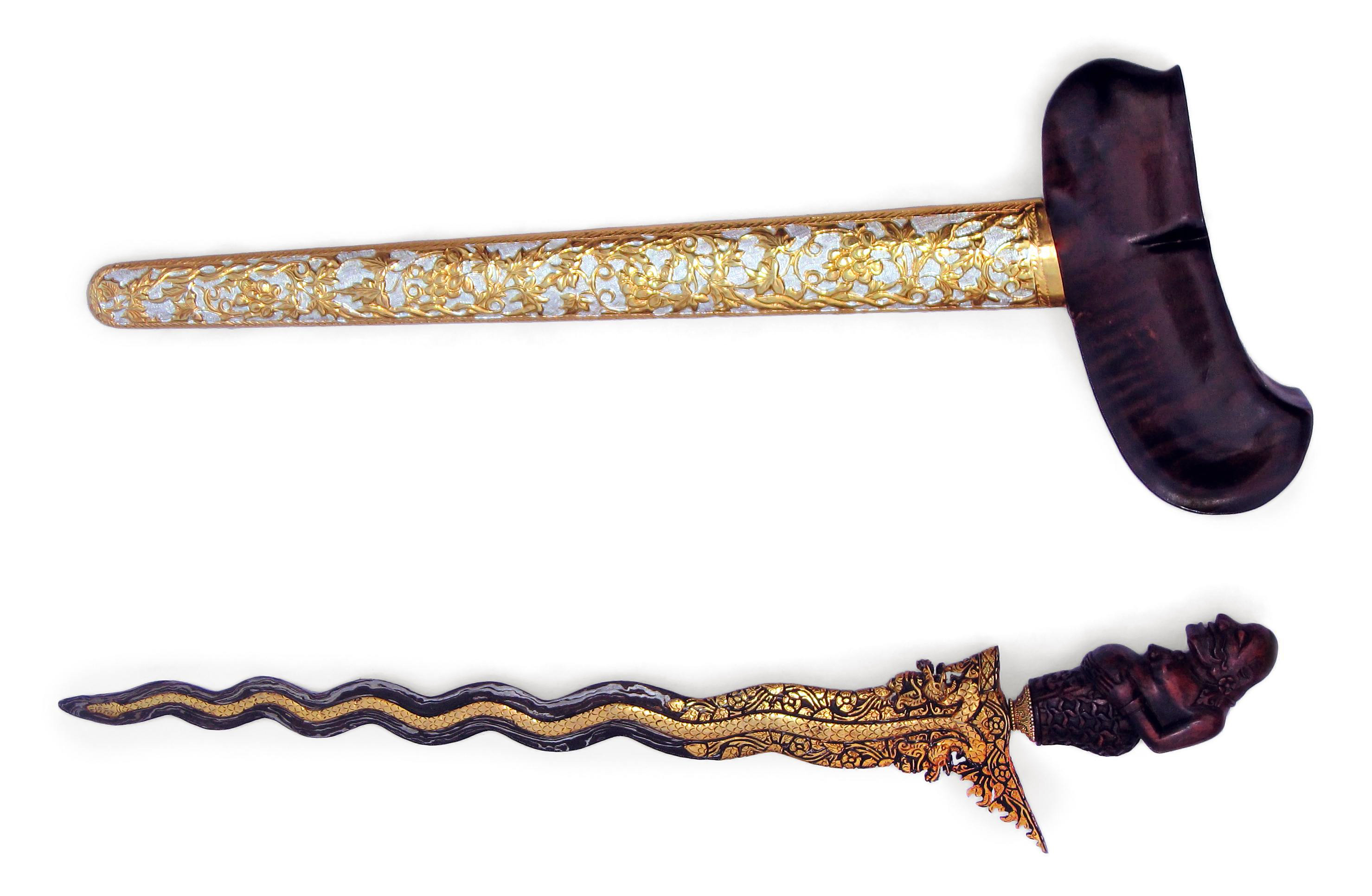
A decorative kris with a figure of Semar as the handle

As Semar is one of the few characters in wayang stories not from Indian mythology, his origin is obscure. One hypothesis is that he and his sons are old indigenous deities who became cursed and demoted to servants with the importation of the kshatriya heroes of the Indian epics. Semar also resembles the vidusaka clown figure of Indian Sanskrit drama.

The first known appearance of Semar is during the Majapahit era. In 1358 in relief of Sudamala in Candi TIgamangi, and in Candi Sukuh dated 1439. The relief was copied from a wayang story from the period, where Semar was first known to appeare.

== Stories ==
In one version of the Babad Tanah Jawi (the Javanese creation myth), Semar cultivated a small rice field near Mount Merbabu for ten thousand years before there were any men. His descendants, the spirits of the island, came into conflict with people as they cleared fields and populated the island. A powerful priest, unable to deviate from his king's orders to continue cultivating the island, provided Semar with a role that would allow his children and grandchildren to stay. Semar's role was to be a spiritual advisor and magical supporter of the royalty, and those of his descendants who also protect the humans of Java can remain there.

One genealogy of Semar is that he is the eldest descendant of God, and elder brother to Batara Guru, king of the other gods; however, Semar became a man. Another genealogy says that he is the son of Adam and Eve. His brother, the Prophet Shith (biblical Seth) was the ancestor of various prophets, such as Jesus and Muhammad, from whom the various Western peoples are descended, while Semar (known as "Sayang Sis") was the ancestor of both the Hindus and the Javanese. In either case, Semar, in his awkward, ugly human form, represents at the same time god and clown, the most spiritually refined and outwardly rough.

== Use in wayang ==
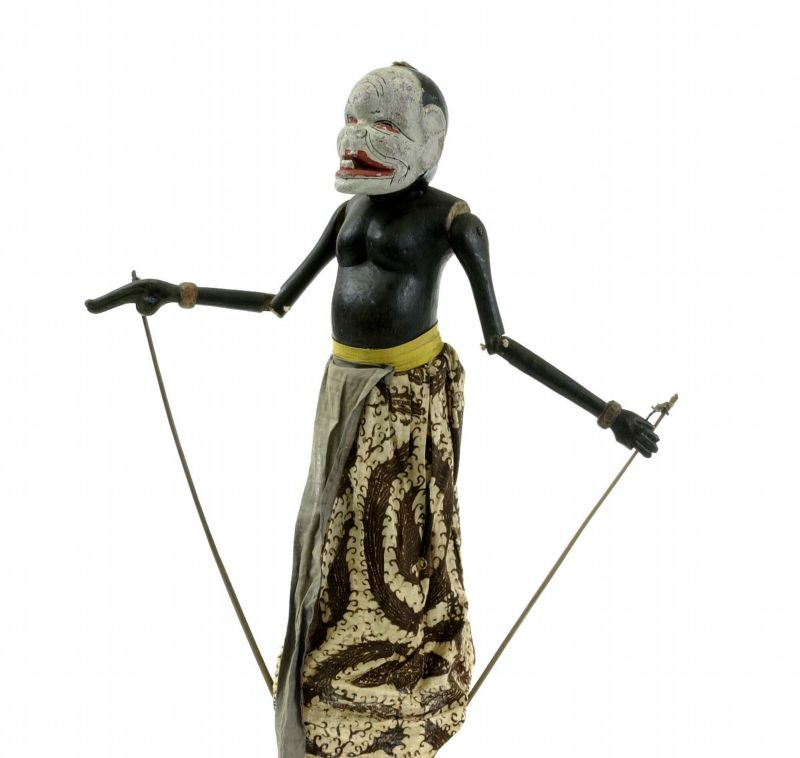
Sundanese wayang adaptation of Semar.

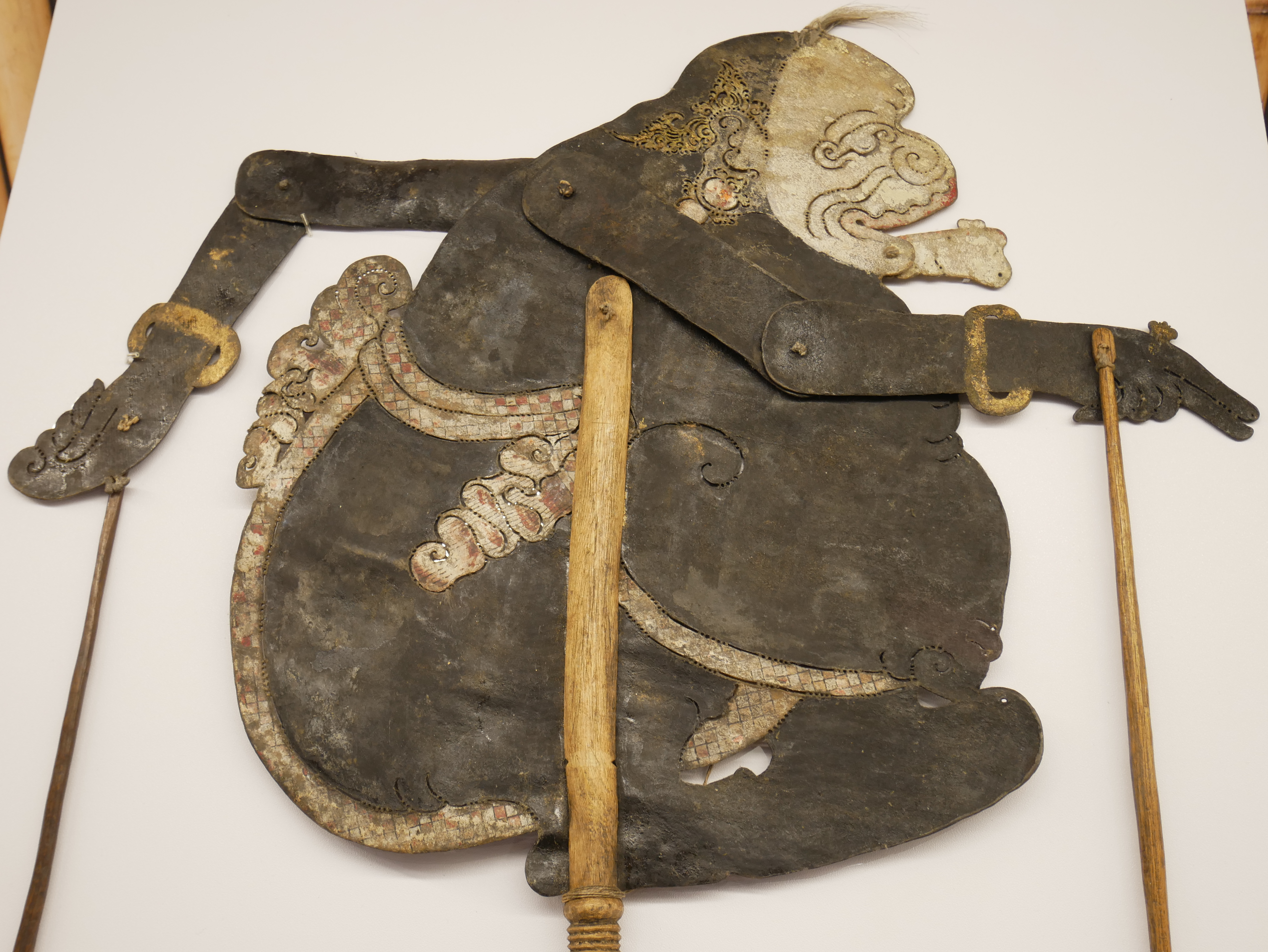
Wayang Kulit puppet of Semar

Semar and his sons first appear in the second part of the plays (pathet sanga), as the servants and counselors of whoever the hero of the wayang play is. In wayang plots, Semar is never mistaken and is deceptively powerful. He is the only character who dares to protest the gods, including Batara Guru (Shiva) and Batari Durga, and even compel them to act or desist.

He often represents a realistic view of the world in contrast to the idealistic. His role as a servant is to cheer up those in despair and blunt the pride of the triumphant. Clifford Geertz compared his role vis-à-vis Arjuna to that of Prince Hal with his father in Shakespeare's Henry IV, and his role as a critic of the play's worldview and antidote to pride is similar to Falstaff.

It has also been suggested that Semar is a symbol of the peasantry, not otherwise incorporated in the palace hierarchies; that in some more popular forms of the drama, he and the other clowns dominate the royal heroes supporting this idea.

Kelantanese practicitioners of wayang kulit (known locally as Wayang Siam) who themselves were taught and inspired by counterparts in Java once invoked Semar (known here as Pak Dogol or Pak Dogah) alongside Shiva and Vishnu before the start of their performances. Pak Dogol similarly is the most ritually important figures in the Wayang Siam pantheon.

== Other representations ==
Semar also appears on some ceremonial weapons, the pusaka of important families. In this role, he represents an ancestral figure.

There is a low rectangular candi on the Dieng Plateau known as Candi Semar, perhaps originally a treasury, but scholars generally assume that its name was given to the temple centuries after its erection.

In Balinese mythology, the counterpart of Semar is Twalen. In Wayang Kulit Kelantan, the counterpart of Semar is Pak Dogol.

During the Transition to the New Order in March 1966, Suharto's forces dubbed the Order of Eleventh March document "Supersemar". While an abbreviation of its official title ("Surat Perintah Sebelas Maret"), consensus among academic historians such as Claire Holt and David Bourchier is that Suharto deliberately associated his image with that of Semar to appeal to Indonesia's Javanese population.

== See also ==
- Mythology of Indonesia
- Kejawen
