= Bambang Sumantri =

Stock character in Javanese traditional puppet theater

In Javanese traditional puppet theater, Bambang Sumantri (also known as Raden Sumantri) is a stock character — specifically, a knight with a handsome face and destructive weapons, Cakrabaskara. Bambang was the eldest son of Begawan Suwandagni at the Hermitage Ardisekar. Rishi Suwandagni still cousins with Ramaparasu son of Rishi Jamadagni. Bambang Sumantri's brother is Bambang Sukrasana..
